= List of airports by ICAO code: V =

List of airports by ICAO code: A - B - C - D - EB-EG - EH-EY - FA-FM - FN-FZ - G - H - ~~I~~ - J - KA-KH - KI-KP - KR-KZ - LA-LJ - LK-LZ - M - N - O - P - Q - R - SA-SC - SD-SH - SI - SJ - SK-SM - SN-SP - SQ - SS-SU - SV-SY - T - U - V - W - ~~X~~ - Y - Z

== VA, VE, VI, VO - India ==
Also see airport category and list.

VA - Mumbai Flight Information Region (VABF)
ICAO	IATA	Airport Name	Airport Type	City	District	State/UT	Coordinates
VAAH	AMD	Sardar Vallabhbhai Patel International Airport	International	Ahmedabad	Ahmedabad	Gujarat	23°04′38″N 072°38′05″E
VAAM	AVR	Amravati Airport	Domestic	Amravati	Amravati	Maharashtra	20°48′48″N 077°43′04″E
VAAU	IXU	Aurangabad Airport	International (Customs)	Aurangabad	Aurangabad	Maharashtra	19°51′46″N 075°23′53″E
VABB	BOM	Chhatrapati Shivaji Maharaj International Airport	International	Mumbai	Mumbai Suburban	Maharashtra	19°05′19″N 072°52′05″E
VABJ	BHJ	Bhuj Airport	Domestic (Civil Enclave)	Bhuj	Bhuj	Gujarat	23°17′16″N 069°40′13″E
VABO	BDQ	Vadodara Airport	Domestic	Vadodara	Vadodara	Gujarat	22°19′46″N 073°13′10″E
VABP	BHO	Raja Bhoj Airport	Domestic	Bhopal	Bhopal	Madhya Pradesh	23°17′15″N 077°20′15″E
VABV	BHU	Bhavnagar Airport	Domestic	Bhavnagar	Bhavnagar	Gujarat	21°45′08″N 072°11′07″E
VADN	NMB	Daman Airport	Domestic (Civil Enclave)	Daman	Daman	Dadra and Nagar Haveli and Daman and Diu	20°26′04″N 072°50′36″E
VADU	DIU	Diu Airport	Domestic	Diu	Diu	Dadra and Nagar Haveli and Daman and Diu	20°42′47″N 070°55′30″E
VAGD	GDB	Gondia Airport	Domestic	Gondia	Gondia	Maharashtra	21°31′19″N 080°17′17″E
VAGO	GOI	Dabolim International Airport	International (Civil Enclave)	Dabolim	South Goa	Goa	15°22′51″N 073°49′53″E
VAHS	HSR	Rajkot International Airport	International (Customs)	Hirasar	Rajkot	Gujarat	22°23′17″N 071°01′42″E
VAID	IDR	Devi Ahilya Bai Holkar Airport	International (Customs)	Indore	Indore	Madhya Pradesh	22°43′18″N 075°48′03″E
VAJB	JLR	Jabalpur Airport	Domestic	Jabalpur	Jabalpur	Madhya Pradesh	23°11′05″N 080°03′32″E
VAJJ		Juhu Aerodrome	Domestic	Mumbai	Mumbai Suburban	Maharashtra	19°05′53″N 072°50′02″E
VAJL	JLG	Jalgaon Airport	Domestic	Jalgaon	Jalgaon	Maharashtra	20°57′43″N 075°37′36″E
VAJM	JGA	Jamnagar Airport	Domestic (Civil Enclave)	Jamnagar	Jamnagar	Gujarat	22°27′56″N 070°00′45″E
VAKE	IXY	Kandla Airport	Domestic	Kandla	Kutch	Gujarat	23°06′46″N 070°06′01″E
VAKJ	HJR	Khajuraho Airport	Domestic	Khajuraho	Chhatarpur	Madhya Pradesh	24°49′02″N 079°55′07″E
VAKP	KLH	Kolhapur Airport	Domestic	Kolhapur	Kolhapur	Maharashtra	16°39′53″N 074°17′22″E
VAKS	IXK	Keshod Airport	Domestic	Keshod	Junagadh	Gujarat	21°19′01″N 070°16′13″E
VAND	NDC	Shri Guru Gobind Singh Ji Airport	Domestic	Nanded	Nanded	Maharashtra	19°10′55″N 077°19′07″E
VANM	NMI	Navi Mumbai International Airport	International	Navi Mumbai	Raigad	Maharashtra	18°59′31″N 073°03′42″E
VANP	NAG	Dr. Babasaheb Ambedkar International Airport	International	Nagpur	Nagpur	Maharashtra	21°05′32″N 079°02′50″E
VAOZ	ISK	Nashik International Airport	International	Nashik	Nashik	Maharashtra	20°07′10″N 073°54′49″E
VAPO	PNQ	Pune Airport	International (Customs)	Pune	Pune	Maharashtra	18°34′56″N 073°55′11″E
VAPR	PBD	Porbandar Airport	Domestic	Porbandar	Porbandar	Gujarat	21°38′55″N 069°39′26″E
VARK	RAJ	Rajkot Airport	Domestic	Rajkot	Rajkot	Gujarat	22°18′33″N 070°46′46″E
VASD	SAG	Shirdi Airport	Domestic	Shirdi	Ahmednagar	Maharashtra	19°41′19″N 074°22′44″E
VASL	SSE	Solapur Airport	Domestic	Solapur	Solapur	Maharashtra	17°37′30″N 075°56′10″E
VASU	STV	Surat International Airport	International	Surat	Surat	Gujarat	21°07′04″N 072°44′43″E
VAUD	UDR	Maharana Pratap Airport	Domestic	Udaipur	Udaipur	Rajasthan	24°37′03″N 073°53′40″E

VE - Kolkata Flight Information Region (VECF)
ICAO	IATA	Airport Name	Airport Type	City	District	State/UT	Coordinates
VEAB	IXD	Prayagraj Airport	Domestic (Civil Enclave)	Prayagraj	Prayagraj	Uttar Pradesh	25°26′24″N 081°44′02″E
VEAT	IXA	Maharaja Bir Bikram Airport	Domestic	Agartala	West Tripura	Tripura	23°53′24″N 091°14′32″E
VEAY	AYJ	Maharishi Valmiki International Airport	International (Customs)	Ayodhya	Ayodhya	Uttar Pradesh	26°44′53″N 082°09′03″E
VEBD	IXB	Bagdogra Airport	International (Customs)	Siliguri	Darjeeling	West Bengal	26°40′52″N 088°19′43″E
VEBI	SHL	Shillong Airport	Domestic	Shillong	East Khasi Hills	Meghalaya	25°42′13″N 091°58′43″E
VEBN	VNS	Lal Bahadur Shastri International Airport	International	Varanasi	Varanasi	Uttar Pradesh	25°27′08″N 082°51′34″E
VEBS	BBI	Biju Patnaik International Airport	International	Bhubaneswar	Khordha	Odisha	20°14′40″N 085°49′04″E
VEBU	PAB	Bilaspur Airport	Domestic	Bilaspur	Bilaspur	Chhattisgarh	21°59′18″N 082°06′40″E
VECC	CCU	Netaji Subhas Chandra Bose International Airport	International	Kolkata	Kolkata	West Bengal	22°39′17″N 088°26′48″E
VECO	COH	Cooch Behar Airport	Domestic	Cooch Behar	Cooch Behar	West Bengal	26°19′50″N 089°28′02″E
VECX	KNU	Kanpur Airport	Domestic (Civil Enclave)	Kanpur	Kanpur Nagar	Uttar Pradesh	26°23′58″N 080°25′37″E
VEDB	DBD	Dhanbad Airport	Domestic	Dhanbad	Dhanbad	Jharkhand	23°50′02″N 086°25′31″E
VEDG	RDP	Kazi Nazrul Islam Airport	Domestic	Durgapur	Paschim Bardhaman	West Bengal	23°37′17″N 087°14′36″E
VEDH	DBR	Darbhanga Airport	Domestic (Civil Enclave)	Darbhanga	Darbhanga	Bihar	26°11′41″N 085°55′03″E
VEDO	DGH	Deoghar Airport	Domestic	Deoghar	Deoghar	Jharkhand	24°26′41″N 086°42′09″E
VEGK	GOP	Gorakhpur Airport	Domestic (Civil Enclave)	Gorakhpur	Gorakhpur	Uttar Pradesh	26°44′22″N 083°26′58″E
VEGT	GAU	Lokpriya Gopinath Bordoloi International Airport	International	Guwahati	Kamrup Metropolitan	Assam	26°06′22″N 091°35′09″E
VEGY	GAY	Gaya Airport	International (Customs)	Gaya	Gaya	Bihar	24°44′40″N 084°57′04″E
VEHO	HGI	Donyi Polo Airport	Domestic	Itanagar	Itanagar	Arunachal Pradesh	26°58′12″N 093°39′53″E
VEIM	IMF	Imphal International Airport	International	Imphal	Imphal West	Manipur	24°45′36″N 093°53′48″E
VEJH	JRG	Veer Surendra Sai Airport	Domestic	Jharsuguda	Jharsuguda	Odisha	21°54′48″N 084°03′01″E
VEJR	JGB	Jagdalpur Airport	Domestic	Jagdalpur	Bastar	Chhattisgarh	19°04′28″N 082°02′13″E
VEJT	JRH	Jorhat Airport	Domestic (Civil Enclave)	Jorhat	Jorhat	Assam	26°43′54″N 094°10′32″E
VEKI	KBK	Kushinagar International Airport	International	Kushinagar	Kushinagar	Uttar Pradesh	26°46′12″N 083°54′29″E
VEKU	IXS	Silchar Airport	Domestic (Civil Enclave)	Silchar	Cachar	Assam	24°54′47″N 092°58′43″E
VELP	AJL	Lengpui Airport	Domestic	Aizawl	Aizawl	Mizoram	23°50′18″N 092°37′13″E
VELR	IXI	Lilabari Airport	Domestic	North Lakhimpur	Lakhimpur	Assam	27°17′44″N 094°05′52″E
VEMN	DIB	Dibrugarh Airport	Domestic	Dibrugarh	Dibrugarh	Assam	27°29′01″N 095°01′01″E
VEMR	DMU	Dimapur Airport	Domestic	Dimapur	Dimapur	Nagaland	25°53′02″N 093°46′16″E
VEPG	IXT	Pasighat Airport	Domestic (Civil Enclave)	Pasighat	East Siang	Arunachal Pradesh	28°04′07″N 095°20′04″E
VEPT	PAT	Jay Prakash Narayan Airport	International (Customs)	Patna	Patna	Bihar	25°35′29″N 085°05′21″E
VEPU	PXN	Purnea Airport	Domestic	Purnia	Purnia	Bihar	25°45′35″N 087°24′36″E
VEPY	PYG	Pakyong Airport	Domestic	Gangtok	Gangtok	Sikkim	27°13′57″N 088°35′18″E
VERC	IXR	Birsa Munda Airport	Domestic	Ranchi	Ranchi	Jharkhand	23°18′51″N 085°19′18″E
VERP	RPR	Swami Vivekananda Airport	Domestic	Raipur	Raipur	Chhattisgarh	21°10′53″N 081°44′26″E
VERU	RUP	Rupsi Airport	Domestic	Dhubri	Dhubri	Assam	26°08′28″N 089°54′24″E
VEST	TNI	Satna Airport	Domestic	Satna	Satna District	Madhya Pradesh	24°33′26″N 080°51′48″E
VETJ	TEI	Tezu Airport	Domestic (Civil Enclave)	Tezu	Lohit	Arunachal Pradesh	27°56′32″N 096°08′02″E
VETZ	TEZ	Tezpur Airport	Domestic (Civil Enclave)	Tezpur	Sonitpur	Assam	26°42′44″N 092°47′14″E
VEUK	UKE	Utkela Airport	Domestic	Utkela	Kalahandi	Odisha	20°05′52″N 083°11′00″E
VEZO	ZER	Zero Airport	Domestic (Civil Enclave)	Ziro	Lower Subansiri	Arunachal Pradesh	27°35′18″N 093°49′41″E

VI - Delhi Flight Information Region (VIDF)
ICAO	IATA	Airport Name	Airport Type	City	District	State/UT	Coordinates
VIAG	AGR	Agra Airport	Domestic (Civil Enclave)	Agra	Agra	Uttar Pradesh	27°09′43″N 077°58′15″E
VIAM	AMI	Ambala Airport	Domestic (Civil Enclave)	Ambala Cantt	Ambala	Haryana	30°22′15″N 076°49′04″E
VIAR	ATQ	Sri Guru Ram Dass Jee International Airport	International	Amritsar	Amritsar	Punjab	31°42′28″N 074°47′57″E
VIAX	AIP	Adampur Airport	Domestic (Civil Enclave)	Adampur	Jalandhar	Punjab	31°25′59″N 075°45′38″E
VIBK	BKB	Bikaner Airport	Domestic (Civil Enclave)	Bikaner	Bikaner	Rajasthan	28°04′14″N 073°12′25″E
VIBR	KUU	Bhuntar Airport	Domestic	Manali	Kullu	Himachal Pradesh	31°52′36″N 077°09′16″E
VIBT	BUP	Bathinda Airport	Domestic (Civil Enclave)	Bathinda	Bathinda	Punjab	30°16′12″N 074°45′20″E
VIBY	BEK	Bareilly Airport	Domestic (Civil Enclave)	Bareilly	Bareilly	Uttar Pradesh	28°25′20″N 079°27′03″E
VICG	IXC	Chandigarh Airport	International (Customs)	Chandigarh	Chandigarh	Chandigarh	30°40′29″N 076°47′26″E
VICX	KNU	Kanpur Airport	Domestic	Kanpur	Kanpur	Uttar Pradesh	26°23′58″N 080°25′37″E
VIDD		Safdarjung Airport	Domestic	New Delhi	New Delhi	Delhi	28°35′04″N 077°12′21″E
VIDN	DED	Dehradun Airport	Domestic	Dehradun	Dehradun	Uttarakhand	30°11′23″N 078°10′49″E
VIDP	DEL	Indira Gandhi International Airport	International	New Delhi	New Delhi	Delhi	28°34′07″N 077°06′44″E
VIDX	HDO	Hindon Airport	Domestic (Civil Enclave)	Ghaziabad	Ghaziabad	Uttar Pradesh	28°42′21″N 077°20′32″E
VIGG	DHM	Kangra Airport	Domestic	Dharamsala	Kangra	Himachal Pradesh	32°09′54″N 076°15′48″E
VIGR	GWL	Gwalior Airport	Domestic (Civil Enclave)	Gwalior	Gwalior	Madhya Pradesh	26°17′36″N 078°13′40″E
VIHR	HSS	Hisar Airport	Domestic	Hisar	Hisar	Haryana	29°10′45″N 075°45′19″E
VIHX	HWR	Halwara Airport	Domestic (Civil Enclave)	Halwara	Ludhiana	Punjab	30°44′52″N 075°37′51″E
VIJO	JDH	Jodhpur Airport	Domestic (Civil Enclave)	Jodhpur	Jodhpur	Rajasthan	26°15′26″N 073°03′06″E
VIJP	JAI	Jaipur International Airport	International	Jaipur	Jaipur	Rajasthan	26°49′27″N 075°48′44″E
VIJR	JSA	Jaisalmer Airport	Domestic (Civil Enclave)	Jaisalmer	Jaisalmer	Rajasthan	26°52′49″N 070°51′18″E
VIJU	IXJ	Jammu Airport	Domestic (Civil Enclave)	Jammu	Jammu	Jammu and Kashmir	32°41′21″N 074°50′15″E
VIKG	KQH	Kishangarh Airport	Domestic	Kishangarh	Ajmer	Rajasthan	26°36′05″N 074°48′51″E
VIKO	KTU	Kota Airport	Domestic	Kota	Kota	Rajasthan	25°09′36″N 075°50′44″E
VILD	LUH	Ludhiana Airport	Domestic	Ludhiana	Ludhiana	Punjab	30°51′17″N 075°57′09″E
VILH	IXL	Kushok Bakula Rimpochee Airport	Domestic (Civil Enclave)	Leh	Leh	Ladakh	34°08′09″N 077°32′43″E
VILK	LKO	Chaudhary Charan Singh International Airport	International	Lucknow	Lucknow	Uttar Pradesh	26°45′38″N 080°53′25″E
VIMB	MZS	Moradabad Airport	Domestic	Moradabad / Rampur	Moradabad	Uttar Pradesh	28°49′10″N 078°55′24″E
VIND	DXN	Noida International Airport	International	Noida	New Delhi	Uttar Pradesh	28°10′12″N 077°36′36″E
VIPK	IXP	Pathankot Airport	Domestic (Civil Enclave)	Pathankot	Pathankot	Punjab	32°14′01″N 075°38′04″E
VIPT	PGH	Pantnagar Airport	Domestic	Pantnagar	Udham Singh Nagar	Uttarakhand	29°01′56″N 079°28′27″E
VISM	SLV	Shimla Airport	Domestic	Shimla	Shimla	Himachal Pradesh	31°04′54″N 077°04′05″E
VISR	SXR	Srinagar International Airport	International (Civil Enclave)	Srinagar	Srinagar	Jammu and Kashmir	33°59′14″N 074°46′27″E
VISV	VSV	Shravasti Airport	Domestic	Shravasti	Shravasti	Uttar Pradesh	27°31′02″N 082°03′02″E

VO - Chennai Flight Information Region (VOMF)
ICAO	IATA	Airport Name	Airport Type	City	District	State/UT	Coordinates
VOAT	AGX	Agatti Airport	Domestic	Agatti Island	Lakshadweep	Lakshadweep	10°49′41″N 072°10′44″E
VOBL	BLR	Kempegowda International Airport	International	Bengaluru	Bengaluru Rural	Karnataka	13°11′56″N 077°42′20″E
VOBM	IXG	Belgaum Airport	Domestic	Belgaum	Belgaum	Karnataka	15°51′33″N 074°37′03″E
VOBR	IXX	Bidar Airport	Domestic (Civil Enclave)	Bidar	Bidar	Karnataka	17°54′20″N 077°29′05″E
VOBZ	VGA	Vijayawada International Airport	International	Vijayawada	Krishna	Andhra Pradesh	16°31′44″N 080°47′45″E
VOCB	CJB	Coimbatore International Airport	International	Peelamedu	Coimbatore	Tamil Nadu	11°01′36″N 077°02′30″E
VOCI	COK	Cochin International Airport	International	Kochi	Ernakulam	Kerala	10°09′12″N 076°23′17″E
VOCL	CCJ	Kozhikode International Airport	International	Kozhikode	Kozhikode	Kerala	11°08′10″N 075°57′18″E
VOCP	CDP	Kadapa Airport	Domestic	Kadapa	Kadapa	Andhra Pradesh	14°30′36″N 078°46′22″E
VOGA	GOX	Manohar International Airport	International	Mopa	North Goa	Goa	15°43′56″N 073°52′05″E
VOGB	GBI	Kalaburagi Airport	Domestic	Kalaburagi	Kalaburagi	Karnataka	17°18′28″N 076°57′29″E
VOGO	GOI	Dabolim Airport	International (Civil Enclave)	Panaji	North Goa	Goa	28°49′10″N 078°55′24″E
VOHB	HBX	Hubli Airport	Domestic	Hubli	Dharwad	Karnataka	15°21′42″N 075°05′05″E
VOHS	HYD	Rajiv Gandhi International Airport	International	Hyderabad	Hyderabad	Telangana	17°13′48″N 078°25′55″E
VOHY	BPM	Begumpet Airport	Domestic	Begumpet	Hyderabad	Telangana	17°27′11″N 078°28′03″E
VOKN	CNN	Kannur International Airport	International	Kannur	Kannur	Kerala	11°55′03″N 075°32′41″E
VOKU	KJB	Kurnool Airport	Domestic	Kurnool	Kurnool	Andhra Pradesh	15°42′22″N 078°09′39″E
VOLT	LTU	Latur Airport	Domestic	Latur	Latur	Maharashtra	18°24′42″N 076°27′51″E
VOMD	IXM	Madurai International Airport	International	Madurai	Madurai	Tamil Nadu	09°50′01″N 078°05′22″E
VOML	IXE	Mangalore International Airport	International	Mangalore	Dakshina Kannada	Karnataka	12°57′41″N 074°53′24″E
VOMM	MAA	Chennai International Airport	International	Chennai	Chennai	Tamil Nadu	12°58′56″N 080°09′49″E
VOMY	MYQ	Mysore Airport	Domestic	Mysore	Mysore	Karnataka	12°13′57″N 076°39′23″E
VOPB	IXZ	Veer Savarkar International Airport	International (Civil Enclave)	Port Blair	South Andaman	Andaman and Nicobar Islands	11°38′28″N 092°43′47″E
VOPC	PNY	Pondicherry Airport	Domestic	Puducherry	Puducherry	Puducherry	11°58′00″N 079°48′52″E
VORY	RJA	Rajahmundry Airport	Domestic	Rajahmundry	East Godavari	Andhra Pradesh	17°06′37″N 081°49′06″E
VOSH	RQY	Shivamogga Airport	Domestic	Shivamogga	Shimoga	Karnataka	13°51′17″N 075°36′38″E
VOSM	SXV	Salem Airport	Domestic	Salem	Salem	Tamil Nadu	11°46′55″N 078°03′52″E
VOSR	SDW	Sindhudurg Airport	Domestic	Sindhudurg	Sindhudurg	Maharashtra	16°00′08″N 073°31′47″E
VOTK	TCR	Tuticorin Airport	Domestic	Tuticorin	Thoothukudi	Tamil Nadu	08°43′27″N 078°01′33″E
VOTP	TIR	Tirupati International Airport	International	Thirupathi	Chittoor	Andhra Pradesh	13°38′16″N 079°32′50″E
VOTR	TRZ	Tiruchirappalli International Airport	International	Tiruchirapalli	Thiruchirapalli	Tamil Nadu	10°45′56″N 078°42′54″E
VOTV	TRV	Thiruvananthapuram International Airport	International	Thiruvananthapuram	Thiruvananthapuram	Kerala	08°28′58″N 076°55′09″E
VOVI	VTZ	Alluri Sitarama Raju International Airport	International	Visakhapatnam	Vizianagaram	Andhra Pradesh	17°58′34″N 083°30′14″E
VOVZ		INS Dega	Defence	Visakhapatnam	Visakhapatnam	Andhra Pradesh	17°43′16″N 083°13′28″E

== VC - Sri Lanka ==
Also see airport category and list.

ICAO	IATA	Airport name	Community	Coordinates
VCBI	CMB	Bandaranaike International Airport	Colombo	07°10′52″N 079°53′06″E
VCCA	ACJ	Anuradhapura Airport	Anuradhapura	08°18′05″N 080°25′41″E
VCCB	BTC	Batticaloa International Airport	Batticaloa	07°42′19″N 081°40′40″E
VCCC	RML	Ratmalana Airport	Colombo	06°49′23″N 079°53′12″E
VCCG	ADP	Ampara Airport	Ampara	07°20′15″N 081°37′32″E
VCCH	HIM	Hingurakgoda Airport	Minneriya	08°02′59″N 080°58′53″E
VCCJ	JAF	Jaffna International Airport	Jaffna	09°47′32″N 080°04′12″E
VCCK	KCT	Koggala Airport	Galle	05°59′38″N 080°19′16″E
VCCN	KTY	Katukurunda Airport	Kalutara	06°33′06″N 079°58′45″E
VCCS	GIU	Sigiriya Airport	Dambulla	07°57′21″N 081°40′44″E
VCCT	TRR	China Bay Airport	Trincomalee	08°32′22″N 081°10′54″E
VCCV		Vavuniya Airport	Vavuniya	08°44′28″N 080°29′52″E
VCCW	WRZ	Weerawila Airport	Hambantota	06°15′17″N 081°14′07″E
VCRI	HRI	Mattala Rajapaksa International Airport	Hambantota	06°17′10″N 081°07′32″E

== VD - Cambodia ==
Also see airport category and list.

ICAO	IATA	Airport name	Community	Coordinates	Notes
VDBG	BBM	Battambang Airport	Battambang	13°05′44″N 103°13′28″E	
VDDS	DSY	Dara Sakor International Airport	Koh Kong Province	10°54′54″N 103°13′26″E	
VDKC		Kampong Cham Airport	Kampong Cham	12°01′44″N 105°26′28″E	
VDKH	KZC	Kampong Chhnang Airport	Kompong Chhnang	12°15′12″N 104°34′03″E	
VDKK	KKZ	Koh Kong Airport	Koh Kong	11°36′47″N 102°59′51″E	
VDKT	KTI	Kratie Airport	Kratie	12°29′22″N 106°03′18″E	
VDMK		Mondulkiri Airport	Mondulkiri	12°27′45″N 107°11′13″E	
VDPP	PNH	Phnom Penh International Airport (Pochentong International)	Phnom Penh	11°32′47″N 104°50′38″E	Closed
VDRK	RBE	Ratanankiri Airport	Ratanankiri	13°43′55″N 106°59′01″E	
VDSA	SAI	Siem Reap–Angkor International Airport	Siem Reap	13°22′31″N 104°13′15″E	
VDSR	REP	Siem Reap International Airport	Siem Reap	13°24′38″N 103°48′46″E	Closed
VDST	TNX	Stung Treng Airport	Stung Treng	13°31′54″N 106°00′52″E	
VDSV	KOS	Sihanoukville International Airport	Sihanoukville	10°34′46″N 103°38′12″E	
VDSY	KZD	Krakor Airport	Krakor	12°32′14″N 104°08′54″E	
VDTI	KTI	Techo International Airport	Kandal, Phnom Penh	11°21′47″N 104°55′00″E	

== VG - Bangladesh ==
Also see airport category and list.

ICAO	IATA	Airport name	Community	Coordinates	Notes
VGBG		Bogra Airport	Bogra	24°52′00″N 089°18′59″E	Military
VGBR	BZL	Barisal Airport	Barisal	22°48′04″N 090°18′04″E	
VGCB	CXB	Cox's Bazar Airport	Cox's Bazar	21°27′07″N 091°57′50″E	
VGCM	CLA	Comilla Airport	Comilla	23°26′12″N 091°11′24″E	
VGEG	CGP	Shah Amanat International Airport	Chittagong	22°14′59″N 091°48′48″E	
VGHS	DAC	Shahjalal International Airport	Dhaka	23°50′34″N 090°24′02″E	
VGIS	IRD	Ishwardi Airport	Ishwardi	24°09′11″N 089°02′55″E	
VGJR	JSR	Jessore Airport	Jessore	23°11′01″N 089°09′39″E	
VGLM		Lalmonirhat Airport	Lalmonirhat	25°53′15″N 089°25′59″E	Military
VGRJ	RJH	Shah Makhdum Airport	Rajshahi	24°26′13″N 088°36′59″E	
VGSD	SPD	Saidpur Airport	Saidpur	25°45′33″N 088°54′31″E	
VGSG	TKR	Thakurgaon Airport	Thakurgaon	26°00′59″N 088°24′06″E	
VGSH	ZHM	Shamshernagar Airport	Shamshernagar	24°23′54″N 091°55′01″E	Military
VGSY	ZYL	Osmani International Airport	Sylhet	24°57′48″N 091°52′01″E	
VGTJ		Tejgaon Airport	Dhaka	23°46′43″N 090°22′57″E	Military

== VH - Hong Kong ==
Also see airport category and list.

ICAO	IATA	Airport name	Community	Coordinates	Notes
VHHH	HKG	Hong Kong International Airport	Chek Lap Kok	22°18′32″N 113°54′52″E	
VHHX		Kai Tak International Airport	Kowloon	22°19′43″N 114°11′39″E	Closed
VHSK		Shek Kong Airfield	Shek Kong (former RAF Shek Kong)	22°26′11″N 114°04′50″E	Military; former RAF Shek Kong
VHST	HHP	Shun Tak Heliport	Sheung Wan	22°17′20″N 114°09′08″E	

== VL - Laos ==
Also see airport category and list.

ICAO	IATA	Airport name	Community	Coordinates	Notes
VLAP	AOU	Attapeu International Airport	Attopeu	14°47′35″N 107°02′43″E	Closed
VLBK	BOR	Bokeo International Airport	Ton Pheung District (Bokeo Province)	20°19′26″N 100°09′56″E	
VLFL	PCQ	Phongsaly Boun Neua Airport	Phongsaly	21°38′51″N 101°54′00″E	
VLHS	HOE	Ban Huoeisay Airport	Houayxay (Bokeo Province)	20°15′28″N 100°26′13″E	
VLKG	KOG	Khong Island Airport	Khong Island (Champasak Province)	14°06′40″N 105°49′01″E	
VLLB	LPQ	Luang Prabang International Airport	Luang Prabang	19°53′50″N 102°09′39″E	
VLLN	LXG	Luang Namtha Airport	Luang Namtha	20°57′38″N 101°24′09″E	
VLOS	ODY	Oudomsay Airport	Muang Xay (Oudomxay Province)	20°40′55″N 101°59′35″E	
VLPS	PKZ	Pakse International Airport	Pakse (Champasak Province)	15°08′02″N 105°46′55″E	
VLSB	ZBY	Sayaboury Airport	Sayaboury	19°14′37″N 101°42′34″E	
VLSK	ZVK	Savannakhet Airport	Savannakhet	16°33′24″N 104°45′34″E	
VLSN	NEU	Nathong Airport	Sam Neua (Houaphanh province)	20°36′40″N 104°04′11″E	
VLSP		Sepon Airport	Xépôn (Savannaket)	16°57′33″N 105°58′54″E	
VLSV	VNA	Saravane Airport	Saravane	15°42′33″N 106°24′41″E	
VLTK	THK	Thakhek Airport	Thakhek	17°22′41″N 104°51′27″E	
VLVT	VTE	Wattay International Airport	Vientiane	17°59′18″N 102°33′48″E	
VLXK	XKH	Xieng Khouang Airport	Xieng Khouang	19°26′25″N 103°10′06″E	

== VM - Macau ==
Also see airport category and list.

ICAO	IATA	Airport name	Community	Coordinates
VMMC	MFM	Macau International Airport	Taipa	22°08′58″N 113°35′29″E
VMMH	XZM	Macau Heliport	Sé	22°11′50″N 113°33′33″E

== VN - Nepal ==
Also see airport category and list.

ICAO	IATA	Airport name	Community	Coordinates	Notes
VNBG	BJH	Bajhang Airport	Bajhang	29°32′18″N 081°11′02″E	
VNBJ	BHP	Bhojpur Airport	Bhojpur	27°08′51″N 087°03′03″E	
VNBL	BGL	Baglung Airport	Baglung	28°12′47″N 083°39′57″E	Not in operation
VNBP	BHR	Bharatpur Airport	Bharatpur	27°40′41″N 084°25′46″E	
VNBR	BJU	Bajura Airport	Bajura	29°30′10″N 081°40′10″E	
VNBT	BIT	Baitadi Airport	Baitadi	29°27′53″N 080°33′01″E	Not in operation
VNBW	BWA	Gautam Buddha International Airport	Bhairahawa	27°30′20″N 083°24′58″E	
VNCG	BDP	Chandragadhi Airport	Bhardrapur	26°34′14″N 088°04′45″E	
VNCJ	RUK	Chaurjahari Airport	Chaurjahari	28°37′40″N 082°11′39″E	Formerly VNRK; not in operation
VNDG	DNP	Dang Airport	Tulsipur	28°06′40″N 082°17′39″E	
VNDH	DHI	Dhangadhi Airport	Dhangadhi	28°45′12″N 080°34′55″E	
VNDL	DAP	Darchula Airport	Gokuleshwar	29°40′08″N 080°32′54″E	Not in operation
VNDP	DOP	Dolpa Airport	Dolpa	28°59′09″N 082°49′09″E	
VNDR		Dhorpatan Airport	Dhorpatan	28°29′31″N 083°03′06″E	Not in operation
VNDT	SIH	Doti Airport	Dipayal Silgadhi	29°15′45″N 080°56′11″E	Not in operation
VNFN		Sukilumba Airport	Ilam	26°52′39″N 087°54′18″E	
VNGK	GKH	Palungtar Airport	Palungtar	28°02′18″N 084°27′59″E	Not in operation
VNJI	JIR	Jiri Airport	Jiri	27°37′34″N 086°13′51″E	Not in operation
VNJL	JUM	Jumla Airport	Jumla	29°16′26″N 082°11′23″E	
VNJP	JKR	Janakpur Airport	Janakpur	26°42′31″N 085°55′20″E	
VNJS	JMO	Jomsom Airport	Jomsom	28°46′47″N 083°43′21″E	
VNKD		Man Maya Airport	Khotang	27°10′52″N 086°46′19″E	
VNKL		Kangeldanda Airport	Kangel	27°24′38″N 086°38′48″E	Not in operation
VNKT	KTM	Tribhuvan International Airport	Kathmandu	27°41′47″N 085°21′32″E	
VNLD	LDN	Lamidanda Airport	Lamidanda	27°15′10″N 086°40′16″E	Not in operation
VNLK	LUA	Lukla Airport	Lukla	27°41′16″N 086°43′53″E	
VNLT	LTG	Langtang Airport	Langtang	28°12′41″N 085°34′05″E	Not in operation
VNMA	NGX	Manang Airport	Manang	28°38′28″N 084°05′17″E	Not in operation
VNMC		Masinechaur Airport	Pahada	29°03′33″N 082°44′40″E	Not in operation
VNMG	MEY	Meghauli Airport	Meghauli	27°34′35″N 084°13′42″E	Not in operation
VNMN	XMG	Mahendranagar Airport	Mahendranagar	28°57′48″N 080°08′53″E	Not in operation
VNNG	KEP	Nepalgunj Airport	Nepalgunj	28°06′13″N 081°40′01″E	
VNPK	PKR	Pokhara Airport	Pokhara	28°12′03″N 083°58′55″E	
VNPL	PPL	Phaplu Airport	Phaplu	27°31′05″N 086°35′04″E	
VNPR	PHH	Pokhara International Airport	Pokhara	28°11′23″N 084°00′54″E	
VNRB	RJB	Rajbiraj Airport	Rajbiraj	26°30′30″N 086°44′15″E	
VNRC	RHP	Ramechhap Airport	Ramechhap	27°23′38″N 086°03′41″E	
VNRG		Resunga Airport	Resunga	28°01′30″N 083°15′14″E	
VNRP	RPA	Rolpa Airport	Rolpa	28°16′02″N 082°45′22″E	Not in operation
VNRR	TAL	Talcha Airport	Rara National Park	29°31′18″N 082°08′49″E	
VNRT	RUM	Rumjatar Airport	Rumjatar	27°18′12″N 086°33′03″E	
VNSB	SYH	Syangboche Airport	Syangboche	27°48′40″N 086°42′45″E	Not in operation
VNSI	SIF	Simara Airport	Jitpur Simara	27°09′34″N 084°58′48″E	
VNSK	SKH	Surkhet Airport	Surkhet	28°35′09″N 081°38′07″E	
VNSL	RUK	Rukum Salle Airport	Musikot	28°38′15″N 082°26′59″E	
VNSR	FEB	Sanfebagar Airport	Sanfebagar	29°14′14″N 081°12′55″E	
VNST	IMK	Simikot Airport	Simikot	29°58′16″N 081°49′08″E	
VNTH	TMK	Thamkharka Airport	Thamkharka	27°02′47″N 086°51′29″E	
VNTJ	TPJ	Taplejung Airport	Taplejung	27°21′04″N 087°41′44″E	
VNTP	TPU	Tikapur Airport	Tikapur	28°31′19″N 081°07′22″E	Not in operation
VNTR	TMI	Tumlingtar Airport	Tumlingtar	27°18′54″N 087°11′36″E	
VNVT	BIR	Biratnagar Airport	Biratnagar	26°28′53″N 087°15′50″E	

== VQ - Bhutan ==
Also see airport category and list.

ICAO	IATA	Airport name	Community	Coordinates
VQBT	BUT	Bathpalathang Airport	Jakar, Bumthang	27°33′52″N 090°44′43″E
VQGP	GLU	Gelephu Airport	Gelephu, Sarpang	26°53′04″N 090°27′51″E
VQPR	PBH	Paro Airport	Paro	27°24′12″N 089°25′29″E
VQTY	YON	Yongphulla Airport	Trashigang	27°15′22″N 091°30′55″E

== VR - Maldives ==
Also see airport category and list.

ICAO	IATA	Airport name	Community	Coordinates
VRAH	HRF	Hoarafushi Airport	Hoarafushi, Haa Alifu Atoll	06°58′50″N 072°53′45″E
VRBK	HDK	Kulhudhuffushi Airport	Kulhudhuffushi, Haa Dhaalu Atoll	06°37′52″N 073°04′00″E
VRCF	FND	Funadhoo Airport	Funadhoo Shaviyani Atoll	06°09′40″N 073°17′14″E
VRDA	NMF	Maafaru International Airport	Maafaru, Noonu Atoll	05°49′20″N 073°28′29″E
VREI	IFU	Ifuru Airport	Ifuru Island, Raa Atoll	05°42′29″N 073°01′30″E
VRGD	LMV	Madivaru Airport	Madivaru	05°27′27″N 073°22′13″E
VRKM	MUM	Muli Airport	Muli	02°54′41″N 073°34′55″E
VRMD	DRV	Dharavandhoo Airport	Dharavandhoo Island, Baa Atoll	05°09′21″N 073°07′58″E
VRMG	GAN	Gan International Airport	Gan Island, Seenu Atoll	00°41′36″S 073°09′20″E
VRMH	HAQ	Hanimaadhoo Airport	Hanimaadhoo Island, Haa Dhaalu Atoll	06°44′39″N 073°10′13″E
VRMK	KDO	Kadhdhoo Airport	Kadhdhoo Island, Laamu Atoll	01°51′33″N 073°31′19″E
VRMM	MLE	Velana International Airport (Malé International Airport)	Hulhulé Island, North Malé Atoll	04°11′30″N 073°31′45″E
VRMO	GKK	Kooddoo Airport	Kooddoo Island, Gaaf Alif Atoll	00°44′03″N 073°25′58″E
VRMR	FVM	Fuvahmulah Airport	Fuvahmulah Island, Gnaviyani Atoll	00°18′33″S 073°26′02″E
VRMT	KDM	Kaadedhdhoo Airport	Kaadedhdhoo Island, Gaafu Dhaalu Atoll	00°29′17″N 072°59′49″E
VRMU	DDD	Dhaalu Airport	Kudahuvadhoo, Dhaalu Atoll	02°40′02″N 072°53′34″E
VRMV	VAM	Villa International Airport Maamigili	Maamigili Island, Alif Dhaalu Atoll	03°28′15″N 072°50′10″E
VRNT	TMF	Thimarafushi Airport	Thimarafushi Island, Thaa Atoll	02°12′37″N 073°09′05″E
VRQF	FMT	Faresmaathodaa Airport	Faresmaathodaa	00°11′34″N 073°11′45″E
VRQM	RUL	Maavarulu Airport	Maavarulu Island, Gaafu Dhaalu Atoll	00°20′12″N 073°30′41″E

== VT - Thailand ==
Also see airport category and list.

ICAO	IATA	Airport name	Community	Coordinates	Notes
VTBC		Chanthaburi Airstrip (Royal Thai Navy)	Chantaburi (Chanthaburi)	12°37′49″N 102°01′34″E	
VTBD	DMK	Don Mueang International Airport	Bangkok	13°54′45″N 100°36′15″E	
VTBE		Pak Phreaw Airport	Saraburi	14°30′48″N 100°55′05″E	
VTBF	PYX	Pattaya Airpark	Pattaya	12°49′57″N 100°56′57″E	
VTBG		Kanchanaburi Airport	Kanchanaburi	14°07′34″N 099°26′50″E	
VTBI		Prachinburi Airport	Prachinburi	14°04′40″N 101°22′48″E	
VTBK	KDT	Kamphaeng Saen Airport	Thung Bua	14°05′50″N 099°55′17″E	
VTBL	KKM	Khok Kathiam Air Force Base	Lopburi	14°52′29″N 100°39′47″E	
VTBN		Pranburi Airport	Prachuap Khiri Khan	12°25′03″N 099°52′10″E	
VTBO	TDX	Trat Airport	Trat	12°16′52″N 102°19′28″E	
VTBP		Prachuap Khiri Khan Airport	Prachuap Khiri Khan	11°47′18″N 099°48′17″E	Military
VTBS	BKK	Suvarnabhumi Airport (Nong Ngu Hao Airport)	Samut Prakan (near Bangkok)	13°41′33″N 100°45′02″E	
VTBT		Bang Phra Airport	Chonburi (Chon Buri)	13°14′00″N 100°57′28″E	
VTBU	UTP	U-Tapao International Airport (Utapao/U-Taphao)	Rayong (near Pattaya)	12°40′47″N 101°00′18″E	
VTBW		Watthana Nakhon Airport	Watthana Nakhon / Prachin Buri	13°46′08″N 102°18′56″E	
VTCC	CNX	Chiang Mai International Airport	Chiang Mai	18°46′09″N 098°58′05″E	
VTCH	HGN	Mae Hong Son Airport	Mae Hong Son	19°18′02″N 097°58′31″E	
VTCI	PYY	Pai Airport	Mae Hong Son	19°22′14″N 098°26′09″E	
VTCL	LPT	Lampang Airport	Lampang	18°16′39″N 099°30′20″E	
VTCM		Ban Thi Airport (Lanna Airfield)	Chiang Mai	18°40′35″N 099°06′10″E	
VTCN	NNT	Nan Nakhon Airport	Nan	18°48′10″N 100°47′05″E	
VTCO		Lamphun Airport	Lamphun	18°32′50″N 099°00′44″E	
VTCP	PRH	Phrae Airport	Phrae	18°07′54″N 100°09′44″E	
VTCR		Old Chiang Rai Airport	Chiang Rai	19°53′00″N 099°49′36″E	
VTCS		Mae Sariang Airport	Mae Sariang	18°10′40″N 097°55′50″E	
VTCT	CEI	Chiang Rai International Airport	Chiang Rai	19°57′15″N 099°52′45″E	
VTPB	PHY	Phetchabun Airport	Phetchabun	16°40′33″N 101°11′26″E	
VTPH	HHQ	Hua Hin Airport	Hua Hin / Prachuap Khiri Khan	12°37′42″N 099°57′10″E	
VTPI	TKH	Takhli Air Force Base	Nakhon Sawan	15°16′38″N 100°17′45″E	
VTPL		Lom Sak Airport	Lom Sak / Phetchabun	16°49′27″N 101°15′05″E	
VTPM	MAQ	Mae Sot Airport	Mae Sot	16°42′09″N 098°32′44″E	
VTPO	THS	Sukhothai Airport	Sukhothai	17°13′57″N 099°49′14″E	
VTPP	PHS	Phitsanulok Airport	Phitsanulok	16°46′18″N 100°16′54″E	
VTPR		Photharam Airport (Potaram Ratchaburi Airport)	Photharam	13°40′13″N 099°44′02″E	
VTPT	TKT	Tak Airport	Tak	16°53′53″N 099°15′14″E	
VTPU	UTR	Uttaradit Airport	Uttaradit	17°40′25″N 100°14′05″E	
VTPY		Phumipol Dam Airport	Phumipol Dam / Khuan Phumiphon	17°14′01″N 099°03′25″E	
VTSB	URT	Surat Thani Airport	Surat Thani	09°08′04″N 099°08′33″E	
VTSC	NAW	Narathiwat Airport	Narathiwat	06°31′23″N 101°44′55″E	
VTSE	CJM	Chumphon Airport	Chumphon	10°42′52″N 099°21′32″E	
VTSF	NST	Nakhon Si Thammarat Airport	Nakhon Si Thammarat	08°32′24″N 099°56′25″E	
VTSG	KBV	Krabi International Airport	Krabi	08°05′56″N 098°58′58″E	
VTSH	SGZ	Songkhla Airport	Songkhla	07°11′11″N 100°36′29″E	
VTSK	PAN	Pattani Airport	Pattani	06°47′06″N 101°08′52″E	
VTSM	USM	Samui Airport	Ko Samui (Ko Samui)	09°32′52″N 100°03′44″E	
VTSN		Cha Eian Airport	Nakhon Si Thammarat	08°28′10″N 099°57′21″E	
VTSP	HKT	Phuket International Airport	Phuket	08°06′19″N 098°18′20″E	
VTSR	UNN	Ranong Airport	Ranong	09°46′26″N 098°35′14″E	
VTSS	HDY	Hat Yai International Airport	Hat Yai / Songkhla	06°56′11″N 100°23′37″E	
VTST	TST	Trang Airport	Trang	07°30′41″N 099°36′55″E	
VTSY	BTZ	Betong International Airport	Yala	05°47′11″N 101°08′50″E	
VTUD	UTH	Udon Thani International Airport	Udon Thani	17°23′13″N 102°46′33″E	
VTUI	SNO	Sakon Nakhon Airport	Sakon Nakhon	17°11′48″N 104°07′00″E	
VTUJ	PXR	Surin Airport	Surin	14°52′06″N 103°29′54″E	
VTUK	KKC	Khon Kaen Airport	Khon Kaen	16°27′52″N 102°47′12″E	
VTUL	LOE	Loei Airport	Loei	17°26′45″N 101°43′35″E	
VTUN		Khorat Air Force Base	Nakhon Ratchasima (Khorat)	14°55′52″N 102°04′34″E	
VTUO	BFV	Buriram Airport	Buriram (Buri Ram)	15°13′40″N 103°14′55″E	
VTUQ	NAK	Nakhon Ratchasima Airport	Nakhon Ratchasima (Khorat)	14°57′13″N 102°18′41″E	
VTUR		Rob Muang Airport	Roi Et (Roiet)	16°04′13″N 103°38′45″E	
VTUU	UBP	Ubon Ratchathani Airport	Ubon Ratchathani	15°14′50″N 104°52′14″E	
VTUV	ROI	Roi Et Airport (Roiet Airport)	Roi Et (Roiet)	16°06′34″N 103°46′57″E	
VTUW	KOP	Nakhon Phanom Airport	Nakhon Phanom	17°23′12″N 104°39′38″E	
VTUZ		Nam Phong Air Force Base	Khon Kaen	16°39′06″N 102°57′56″E	

== VV - Vietnam ==
Also see airport category and list.

ICAO	IATA	Airport name	Community	Coordinates	Notes
VVBH		Bien Hoa Airport	Bien Hoa Air Base	10°58′37″N 106°49′06″E	Inactive
VVBM	BMV	Buon Ma Thuot Airport	Buôn Ma Thuột	12°40′05″N 108°07′12″E	
VVCA	VCL	Chu Lai International Airport	Chu Lai	15°24′22″N 108°42′20″E	
VVCI	HPH	Cat Bi International Airport	Hai Phong	20°49′09″N 106°43′29″E	
VVCL		Cam Ly Airport	Da Lat	11°56′34″N 108°24′54″E	Closed
VVCM	CAH	Cà Mau Airport	Cà Mau	09°10′32″N 105°10′46″E	
VVCR	CXR	Cam Ranh International Airport	Nha Trang	11°59′53″N 109°13′10″E	
VVCS	VCS	Con Dao Airport	Côn Đảo	08°43′57″N 106°37′44″E	
VVCT	VCA	Can Tho International Airport	Cần Thơ	10°05′07″N 105°42′43″E	
VVDB	DIN	Dien Bien Phu Airport	Điện Biên Phủ	21°23′50″N 103°00′28″E	
VVDH	VDH	Dong Hoi Airport	Đồng Hới	17°30′54″N 106°35′26″E	
VVDL	DLI	Lien Khuong Airport	Da Lat	11°45′02″N 108°22′25″E	
VVDN	DAD	Da Nang International Airport	Da Nang	16°02′38″N 108°11′58″E	
VVGL		Gia Lam Airport	Hanoi	21°02′28″N 105°53′10″E	Military
VVKP		Kép Air Base	Bac Giang	21°23′23″N 106°15′09″E	
VVLT	LTH	Long Thanh International Airport	Dong Nai	10°47′04″N 107°02′28″E	Not yet open
VVNB	HAN	Noi Bai International Airport	Hanoi	21°13′16″N 105°48′26″E	
VVNS	SQH	Nà Sản Airport	Sơn La	21°12′53″N 104°02′07″E	Closed
VVNT	NHA	Nha Trang Airport	Nha Trang	12°13′39″N 109°11′33″E	Closed
VVPB	HUI	Phu Bai International Airport	Huế	16°24′06″N 107°42′10″E	
VVPC	UIH	Phu Cat Airport	Qui Nhơn	13°57′18″N 109°02′32″E	
VVPK	PXU	Pleiku Airport	Pleiku	14°00′16″N 108°01′02″E	
VVPQ	PQC	Phu Quoc International Airport	Phú Quốc	10°10′18″N 103°59′28″E	Code formerly used for Duong Dong Airport
VVPR	PHA	Phan Rang Air Base	Phan Rang	11°38′06″N 108°57′01″E	
VVPT		Phan Thiet Airport	Phan Thiết	10°59′45″N 108°13′31″E	Not yet open
VVRG	VKG	Rach Gia Airport	Rạch Giá	09°57′35″N 105°08′02″E	
VVTH	TBB	Dong Tac Airport	Tuy Hòa	13°02′58″N 109°20′01″E	
VVTS	SGN	Tan Son Nhat International Airport	Ho Chi Minh City	10°49′08″N 106°39′07″E	
VVTV	PHU	Phu Vinh Airport	Trà Vinh	09°55′24″N 106°19′42″E	Closed
VVTX	THD	Tho Xuan Airport	Thanh Hóa	19°54′06″N 105°28′04″E	
VVVD	VDO	Van Don International Airport	Ha Long	21°07′04″N 107°24′51″E	
VVVH	VII	Vinh International Airport	Vinh	18°44′12″N 105°40′15″E	
VVVT	VTG	Vung Tau Airport	Vũng Tàu	10°22′13″N 107°05′36″E	
VVYB		Yên Bái Air Base	Nam Cường, Lào Cai	21°43′59″N 104°51′14″E	
VVYL		Hòa Lạc Air Base	Hòa Lạc	21°02′17″N 105°29′24″E	

== VY - Myanmar (Burma) ==
Also see airport category and list.

ICAO	IATA	Airport name	Community	Coordinates	Notes
VYAN		Ann Airport	Ann	19°46′08″N 094°01′34″E	
VYAS		Anisakan Airport	Anisakan	21°57′19″N 096°24′21″E	
VYBG	NYU	Nyaung U Airport	Bagan (Pagan)	21°10′43″N 094°55′48″E	
VYBM	BMO	Banmaw Airport	Bhamo	24°16′15″N 097°14′49″E	
VYBP		Bokpyin Airport	Bokpyin	11°08′57″N 098°44′11″E	
VYCI		Coco Island Airport	Coco Island	14°08′29″N 093°22′06″E	
VYCZ		Mandalay Chanmyathazi Airport	Mandalay	21°56′25″N 096°05′22″E	
VYDW	TVY	Dawei Airport	Dawei (Tavoy)	14°06′13″N 098°12′13″E	
VYFS	SRU	Surbung Airport	Falam	22°56′21″N 093°36′55″E	Not yet open
VYGG	GAW	Gangaw Airport	Gangaw	22°10′29″N 094°08′04″E	
VYGW	GWA	Gwa Airport	Gwa	17°36′00″N 094°35′00″E	Coordinates unverified
VYHB		Hmawby Airport	Hmawby	17°07′09″N 096°04′22″E	Military
VYHH	HEH	Heho Airport	Heho	20°44′49″N 096°47′31″E	
VYHL	HOX	Homalin Airport	Homalin (Hommalin)	24°53′58″N 094°54′50″E	
VYHN	TIO	Tilin Airport	Tilin	21°42′00″N 094°06′00″E	Coordinates unverified
VYKG	KET	Kengtung Airport	Kengtung (Kengtong)	21°18′05″N 099°38′09″E	
VYKI	KHM	Khamti Airport	Khamti	25°59′18″N 095°40′28″E	
VYKL	KMV	Kalaymyo Airport	Kalaymyo (Kalemyo)	23°11′19″N 094°03′03″E	
VYKP	KYP	Kyaukpyu Airport	Kyaukpyu	19°25′35″N 093°32′05″E	
VYKT	KAW	Kawthaung Airport	Kawthaung (Kawthoung)	10°02′57″N 098°32′16″E	
VYKU	KYT	Kyauktu Airport	Kyauktu	21°24′45″N 094°08′31″E	
VYLK	LIW	Loikaw Airport	Loikaw	19°41′29″N 097°12′53″E	
VYLS	LSH	Lashio Airport	Lashio	22°58′40″N 097°45′07″E	
VYLY		Lanywa Airport	Lanywa	20°56′25″N 094°49′21″E	
VYMD	MDL	Mandalay International Airport	Mandalay	21°42′07″N 095°58′40″E	
VYME	MGZ	Myeik Airport	Myeik (Mergui)	12°26′23″N 098°37′17″E	
VYMK	MYT	Myitkyina Airport	Myitkyina (Pamti)	25°23′01″N 097°21′06″E	
VYML		Meiktila Airport	Meiktila	20°53′19″N 095°53′21″E	Military
VYMM	MNU	Mawlamyaing Airport	Mawlamyaing (Mawlamyine)	16°26′41″N 097°39′38″E	
VYMN	MGU	Manaung Airport	Manaung	18°50′45″N 093°41′20″E	
VYMO	MOE	Momeik Airport	Momeik	23°05′33″N 096°38′42″E	
VYMS	MOG	Monghsat Airport	Monghsat (Mong Hsat)	20°31′00″N 099°15′24″E	
VYMT	MGK	Mong-Tong Airport	Mong-Tong (Hong Ton)	20°17′48″N 098°53′56″E	
VYMW	MWQ	Magwe Airport	Magwe	20°09′56″N 094°56′28″E	
VYMY		Monywa Airport	Monywa	22°13′27″N 095°05′36″E	
VYNM	NOM	Nogmung Airport	Nogmung	27°30′00″N 097°49′00″E	Coordinates unverified
VYNP		Nampong Air Force Base	Myitkyina	25°21′15″N 097°17′42″E	
VYNS	NMS	Namsang Airport	Namsang	20°53′25″N 097°44′09″E	Joint use
VYNT	NYT	Naypyidaw Airport	Naypyidaw	19°37′24″N 096°12′03″E	Formerly VYEL
VYNU	NMT	Namtu Airport	Namtu	23°05′00″N 097°23′00″E	Coordinates unverified
VYPA	PAA	Hpa-An Airport	Hpa-An (Pa-An)	16°53′37″N 097°40′28″E	
VYPK	PAU	Pauk Airport	Pauk	21°26′57″N 094°29′13″E	
VYPN	BSX	Pathein Airport	Pathein (Bassein)	16°48′54″N 094°46′47″E	
VYPP	PPU	Hpapun Airport	Hpapun	18°04′00″N 097°27′00″E	Coordinates unverified
VYPT	PBU	Putao Airport	Putao	27°19′47″N 097°25′34″E	
VYPU	PKK	Pakokku Airport	Pakokku	21°24′27″N 095°06′47″E	
VYPY	PRU	Pyay Airport	Pyay (Prome)	18°49′28″N 095°15′57″E	
VYST		Shante Air Force Base	Shante	20°56′30″N 095°54′52″E	
VYSW	AKY	Sittwe Airport	Sittwe	20°07′57″N 092°52′21″E	
VYTD	SNW	Thandwe Airport	Thandwe	18°27′38″N 094°18′00″E	
VYTL	THL	Tachilek Airport	Tachilek (Tachileik)	20°29′01″N 099°56′07″E	
VYTO	TGO	Taungoo Air Force Base	Taungoo	19°01′48″N 096°25′00″E	
VYXG		Kyauktu South Airport	Kyauktu	21°24′26″N 094°07′31″E	
VYYE	XYE	Ye Airport	Ye	15°18′00″N 097°52′00″E	Coordinates unverified
VYYY	RGN	Yangon International Airport	Yangon (Rangoon)	16°54′26″N 096°07′59″E	
