= List of airports in the Maldives =

Airports in the Maldives

This is a list of airports in the Maldives, grouped by type and sorted by location.

The Maldives or Maldive Islands, officially the Republic of Maldives, is an island country in the Indian Ocean formed by a double chain of 26 atolls stretching in a north–south direction off India's Lakshadweep islands, between Minicoy Island and Chagos Archipelago. It stands in the Laccadive Sea, about 700 kilometres (435 mi) southwest of Sri Lanka.

The atolls of Maldives encompass a territory spread over roughly 90,000 square kilometres (34,749 sq mi), making it one of the most disparate countries in the world. It features 1,192 islets, of which two hundred are inhabited. The Republic of Maldives's capital and largest city is Malé.

== Airports ==
Airport names shown in bold have scheduled passenger service on commercial airlines.

Location	Serves	ICAO	IATA	Airport name	Coordinates
International airports
Gan	Addu City	VRMG	GAN	**Gan International Airport**	00°41′36″S 073°09′20″E
Hanimaadhoo	Haa Dhaalu	VRMH	HAQ	**Hanimaadhoo International Airport**	06°44′39″N 073°10′13″E
Maafaru	Noonu	VRDA	NMF	**Maafaru International Airport**	05°49′20″N 073°28′29″E
Hulhulé	Malé	VRMM	MLE	**Velana International Airport**	04°11′30″N 073°31′45″E
Maamigili	Alifu Dhaalu	VRMV	VAM	**Villa International Airport Maamigili**	03°28′15″N 072°50′10″E
Domestic airports
Dharavandhoo	Baa	VRMD	DRV	**Dharavandhoo Airport**	05°09′21″N 073°07′58″E
Fuvahmulah	Gnaviyani	VRMR	FVM	**Fuvahmulah Airport**	00°18′33″S 073°26′02″E
Maavarulu	Gaafu Dhaalu Atoll	VRQM	RUL	**Maavarulu Airport**	00°20′12″N 073°30′41″E
Ifuru	Raa, Noonu	VREI	IFU	**Ifuru Airport**	05°42′29″N 073°01′30″E
Kaadedhdhoo	Gaafu Dhaalu	VRMT	KDM	**Kaadedhdhoo Airport**	00°29′17″N 072°59′49″E
Kadhdhoo	Laamu	VRMK	KDO	**Kadhdhoo Airport**	01°51′33″N 073°31′19″E
Kooddoo	Gaafu Alifu	VRMO	GKK	**Kooddoo Airport**	00°44′03″N 073°25′58″E
Kudahuvadhoo	Dhaalu	VRMU	DDD	**Dhaalu Airport**	02°40′02″N 072°53′34″E
Thimarafushi	Thaa	VRNT	TMF	**Thimarafushi Airport**	02°12′37″N 073°09′05″E
Kulhudhuffushi	Haa Dhaalu	VRBK	HDK	**Kulhudhuffushi Airport**	06°37′52″N 073°04′00″E
Madivaru	Lhaviyani	VRGD	LMV	**Madivaru Airport**	05°27′27″N 073°22′13″E
Funadhoo	Shaviyani	VRCF	FND	**Funadhoo Airport**	06°09′40″N 073°17′14″E
Hoarafushi	Haa Alifu Atoll	VRAH	HRF	**Hoarafushi Airport**	06°58′50″N 072°53′45″E
Faresmaathodaa	Gaafu Dhaalu Atoll	VRQF	FMT	**Faresmaathodaa Airport**	0.1929° N, 73.1958° E
Muli	Meemu Atoll	VRKM	MUM	Muli Airport	2.9114° N, 73.5820° E

== See also ==
- Transport in the Maldives
- List of airports by ICAO code: V#VR - Maldives
- List of airlines of the Maldives
- Wikipedia: Airline destination lists: Asia#Maldives
