= Hoarafushi Airport =

Airport in Hoarafushi, the Maldives

Hoarafushi Airport ހޯރަފުށި އެއާޕޯޓް
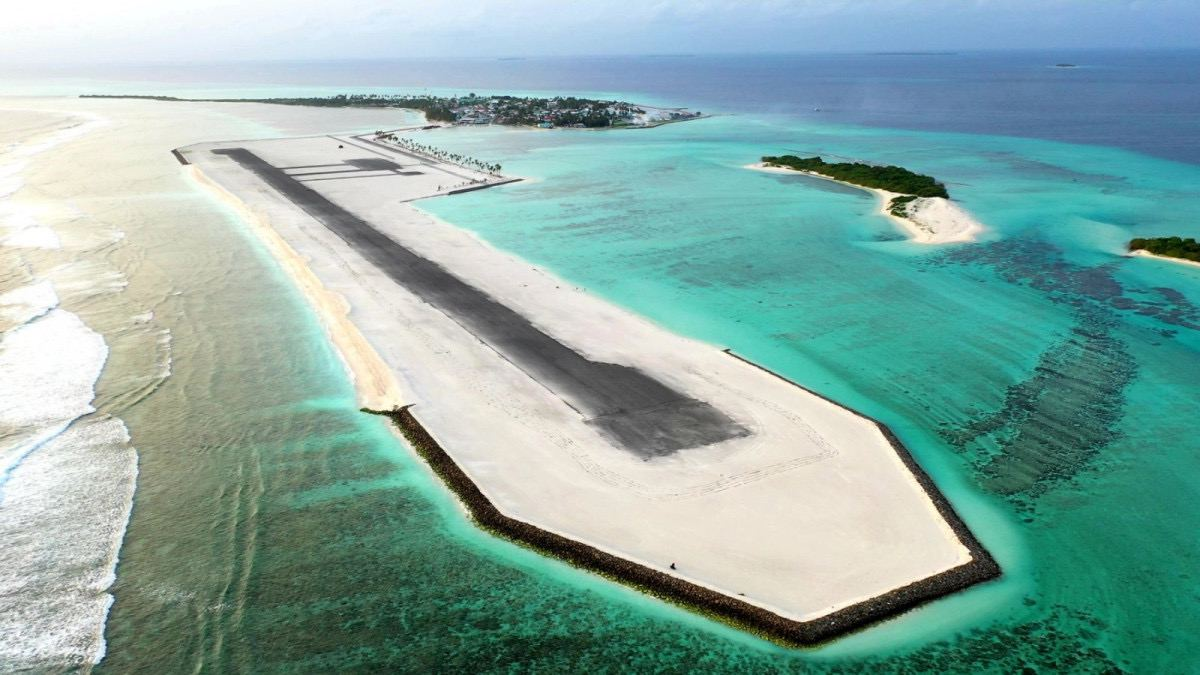
- IATA: HRF; ICAO: VRAH

Summary
- Airport type: Public
- Owner: MACL
- Operator: Regional Airports Company Limited
- Serves: Hoarafushi (Haa Alif Atoll), Haa Alif Atoll, Maldives
- Location: HA. Hoarafushi
- Elevation AMSL: 2 m (6.6 ft)
- Coordinates: 06°58′50″N 072°53′45″E
- Website: macl.aero

Maps
- Location in Maldives
- Interactive map of Hoarafushi Airport

Runways
Direction	Length		Surface
Direction	m	ft	Surface
06/24	1,200	3,937	Asphalt
- Sources: IATA

Hoarafushi Airport (IATA: HRF, ICAO: VRAH) is a domestic airport located on Hoarafushi (Haa Alif Atoll), one of the islands of the Haa Alif Atoll in Maldives. A test flight landed at Hoarafushi Airport on 16 November 2020. Maldives Transport and Contracting Company (MTCC) was contracted the MVR 198 million project in March 2019 to develop the airport terminal and fire building.

== Airlines and destinations ==
The airport currently serves two commercial destinations.

Airlines	Destinations
Maldivian	Hanimaadhoo, Malé
Manta Air	Dharavandhoo, Malé

== See also ==
- List of airports in the Maldives
- List of airlines of the Maldives
