= List of defunct airlines of the Maldives =

This is a list of defunct airlines of the Maldives.

Airline	Image	IATA	ICAO	Callsign	Commenced operations	Ceased operations	Notes
Air Equator		EQ	EQU	Air Equator	2004	2005	
Air Maldives		L6	AMI	AIR MALDIVES	1974	2000	
Island Aviation Services		Q2	DQA	ISLAND AVIATION	2000	2008	re-branded into Maldivian
Maldives Airways		MQ		MALDIVES AIRWAYS	1984	1986	
Maldivian Air Taxi		MV	MAT	AIR TAXI	1993	2013	Merged into Trans Maldivian Airways
Maldives International Airlines					1977	1984	
Mega Maldives		5M	MEG	SANDBAR	2010	2017	
Ocean Air		OCR			2000	2002	

== See also ==
- List of airlines of the Maldives
- List of airports in the Maldives
