= Dharavandhoo Airport =

Airport in the Maldives

Dharavandhoo Airport ދަރަވަންދޫ އެއަރޕޯޓް
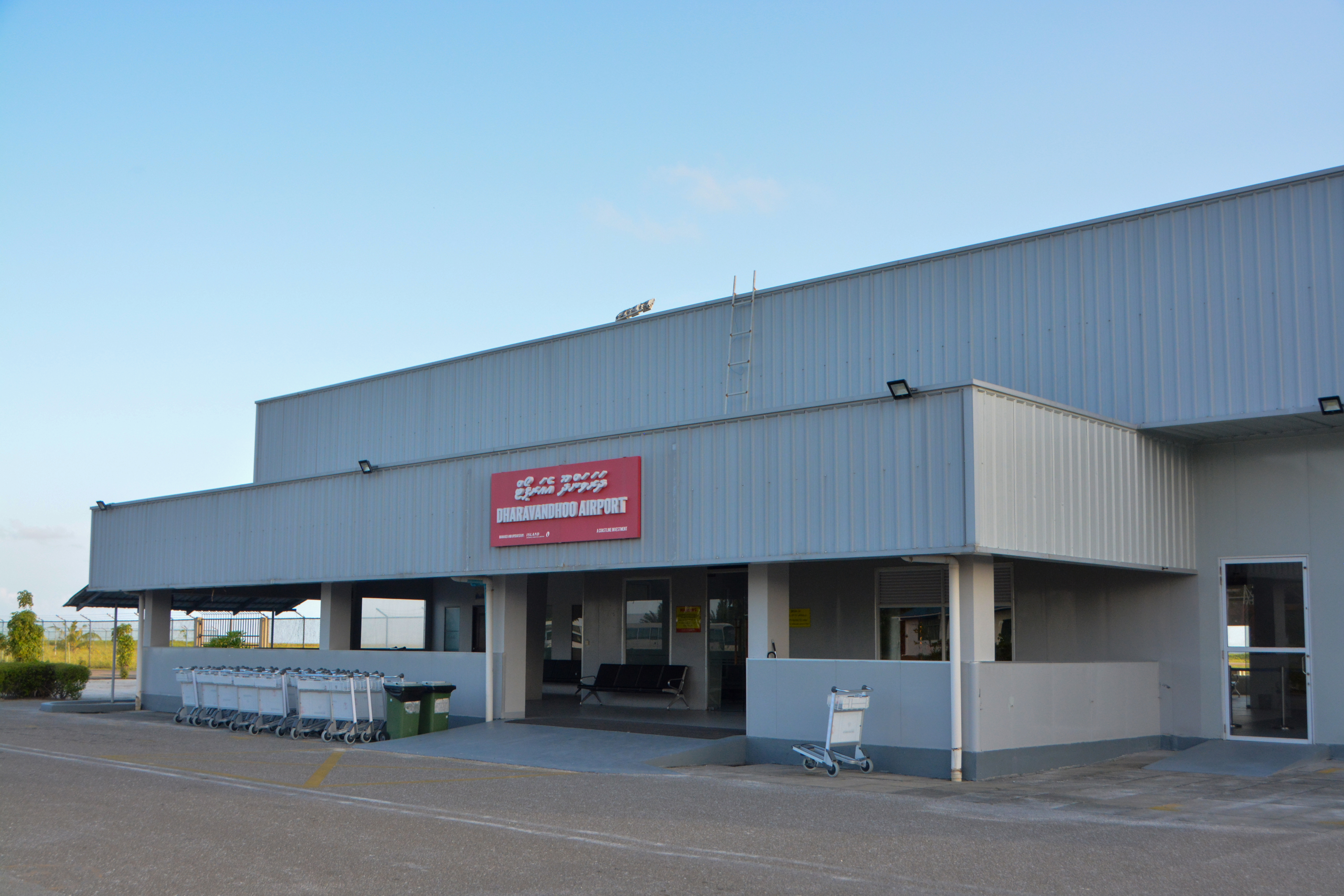
- IATA: DRV; ICAO: VRMD

Summary
- Airport type: Public
- Owner: Island Aviation Services
- Operator: Island Aviation Services
- Serves: Baa Atoll, Maldives
- Location: Dharavandhoo
- Opened: October 17, 2012
- Elevation AMSL: 6 ft (1.8 m)
- Coordinates: 05°09′24″N 073°07′50″E

Maps
- Location in Maldives
- Interactive map of Dharavandhoo Airport

Runways
Direction	Length		Surface
Direction	m	ft	Surface
12/30	1,189	3,901	Asphalt

Dharavandhoo Airport (IATA: DRV, ICAO: VRMD) is a domestic airport located on the island of Dharavandhoo, part of the Baa Atoll in Maldives. It was opened on 17 October 2012 by President Mohamed Waheed Hassan. Flight operations began to the airport on 15th of that month.

== Facilities ==
The airport resides at an elevation of 6 feet (2 m) above mean sea level. It has one runway which is 1,189 metres (3,901 ft) in length.

== Airlines and destinations ==
Airlines	Destinations
Maldivian	Hanimaadhoo, Ifuru, Maafaru, Malé
Manta Air	Ifuru, Madivaru , Malé

== See also ==
- List of airports in the Maldives
- List of airlines of the Maldives
