= Funadhoo =

Funadhoo as a place name may refer to:

- Funadhoo (Baa Atoll) (Republic of Maldives)
- Funadhoo (Kaafu Atoll) (Republic of Maldives)
- Funadhoo (Shaviyani Atoll) (Republic of Maldives)
  - Funadhoo Airport
