= Maafaru International Airport =

Airport of Maafaru, Maldives

- IATA: NMF; ICAO: VRDA

Summary
- Operator: Island Aviation Services Limited
- Serves: Maafaru (Noonu Atoll), Noonu Atoll, Maldives
- Location: Noonu Atoll
- Elevation AMSL: 6 ft / 2 m
- Coordinates: 05°49′20″N 073°28′29″E
- Website: maafaruairport.com

Map
- Location in Maldives

Runways
Direction	Length		Surface
Direction	m	ft	Surface
06/24	2,850	9,350	Asphalt

Maafaru International Airport (IATA: NMF, ICAO: VRDA) is an international airport located on Maafaru, one of the islands of the Noonu Atoll in Maldives. It was officially opened on 1 December 2019. As of 2024, the airport serves both domestic and international services.

== Background ==
The building of the airport is part of a scheme to develop Noonu Atoll as a luxury tourist zone. The plan to construct an airport was first announced by President Maumoon Abdul Gayyoom in the 2000s, and the actual construction was initiated in 2017 by his brother Abdulla Yameen who succeeded him. The building of the airport was funded by Abu Dhabi Fund for Development of United Arab Emirates which provided a grant of US$60 million. It features a 2,200-meter runway that can handle commercial aircraft the size of Airbus A320s and the Boeing 737s. It was constructed by a Singaporean contractor, Tuff Infrastructure Pvt Ltd. Test flight at the airport began on 14 August 2018. Although not completed, the airport project was inaugurated by President Abdulla Yameen on 28 August 2018. After a series of delays, the airport was officially opened by Planning Minister Mohamed Aslam on 1 December 2019, allowing international flight operations at the airport to begin.

== Controversies ==
=== Destruction of endangered turtle nesting grounds ===
The airport was built in an area that was a major nesting ground for endangered turtles as Maafaru has had a long history of being a popular nesting ground endangered turtles.

On 9 April 2019, a green sea turtle that had come to Maafaru to lay its eggs, found the newly constructed runway of a brand new airport instead, and ended up laying her eggs on the tarmac. The turtle later died from the injuries.

=== Illegal export of coconut palms ===
The Maldives Customs Service stopped the illegal export of coconut palm trees from the Maafaru island uprooted as a direct result of the airport project. Maafaru islanders alerted customs after the Environment Protection Agency stopped the illegal uprooting of trees from the island.

=== EPA halts airport expansion project ===
On 29 December 2019, the Maldivian Environmental Protection Agency (EPA) halted the expansion project and rejected the Environmental Impact Assessment, giving the following reasons as justification in their report.

1. The aim of the project given as to accommodate Boeing 777 twinjet landing unfortunately is not a valid justification when compared to the long-term environmental and socio-economic negative impacts that would arise from this project.
2. The frequency of landing of large aircraft is expected to be minimal in the medium-term and the frequency of landing in the long-term is also unknown.
3. Reclamation works would lead to permanent loss of a large area of Maafaru lagoon, affecting the surrounding coral reef ecosystem.
4. Loss of lagoon space for future island expansion, while there is a high demand by the Island Council and community for excess land reclamation to compensate for the land being taken up for this expansion project.
5. Proposed dredging methodology (CSD) takes more time in operation and therefore time-frame for marine impacts is substantial. If the alternative methodology (TSHD) is to be used, the project footprint would expand outside Maafaru lagoon.
6. Sand borrow site for the reclamation has a rich sea-grass bed, which is a habitat for many juvenile marine lives as well as a sea-turtle grazing area.
7. Dredging the inner lagoon would result in turbidity and sedimentation as well as changes to the hydrodynamics which would most likely result in erosion and accretion of the unprotected coastal areas in the residential side of Maafaru, alternatively increasing the cost of the project as shore protection will be required.
8. Island is known for sea-turtle nesting, hence the loss of the grazing site as well as the turtle nesting beaches due to predictable erosion, from the activities of this project will have a direct negative impact on the marine life within the vicinity.
9. The airport expansion footprint will affect a total of 22,000 trees which is a major portion of the existing vegetation of the island. Furthermore, this area also contains plots allocation for residential buildings, pending constructions. Hence, if the compensation plots are to be allocated from the available land, on the other end of the island, that would mean the last remaining mature vegetation of the island would also be destroyed and Maafaru would be left barren of any of its original mature vegetation. (In the report it is stated that a maximum of 250 trees can be re-located within the island). Therefore, considering the huge cumulative impacts to the terrestrial vegetation, it would be impossible to mitigate such impacts in an island environment.
10. The proponent does not hold the legal ownership of the proposed project area, as per the Land Act (Act No. 1/2002).
11. The plan of compensation for the coconut palms and fruit bearing trees in the proposed project area within the island has not yet been decided.

=== Fraud and corruption allegations ===
The contractor for the project, Singaporean company Tuff Infrastructure Pvt Ltd. is facing multiple allegations including failing to pay their subcontractors, using deception and sham projects to win the bid, violations of contract, and inflated costs. As a result, the project was under audit from the Anti Corruption Commission of the Maldives. According to rumors, Regional Airports Director General Saamee Ageel is also accused of owning a private yacht which is currently being investigated by the Asset Recovery Commission of the Office of The President. Anti-Corruption Commission requested that the Regional Airports Deputy Director General Ahmed Mahreen be suspended. Anti-Corruption Commission also requested that payment to contractors for the Maafaru International Airport be suspended.

=== Public opposition to the project ===
There is online opposition to the expansion project including by the Maldivian environmentalist organisation SaveMaldives. The hashtag #SaveMaafaru has been used in regard to this opposition.

== Facilities ==
The airport is at an elevation of 2 metres (6 ft 7 in) above mean sea level. It has one runway which is 2,200 metres (7,218 ft) in length and 40 metres (131 ft) wide. The airport can accommodate six jets at any one time. The airport includes a passenger terminal and a VIP lounge, and is managed and maintained by the national airline Maldivian. And It Also Facilitates (MNDF As The Operation Hanger Of The MNDF Drone Bayraktar TB2

== Airlines and destinations ==
Airlines	Destinations
Maldivian	Hanimaadhoo, Ifuru, Malé

== See also ==
- List of airports in the Maldives
- List of airlines of the Maldives
