= Madivaru =

Madivaru as a place name may refer to:

- Madivaru (Kaafu Atoll) (Republic of Maldives)
- Madivaru (Lhaviyani Atoll) (Republic of Maldives)
- Madivaru (Dhaalu Atoll) (Republic of Maldives)
- Madivaru Airport, an airport on Madivaru, Lhaviyani Atoll, Maldives
