= Thimarafushi Airport =

Thimarafushi Airport ތިމަރަފުށި އެއަރޕޯޓް
- IATA: TMF; ICAO: VRNT

Summary
- Airport type: Public
- Operator: Island Aviation Services
- Serves: Thaa Atoll, Maldives
- Location: Thimarafushi, Thaa Atoll
- Elevation AMSL: 6 ft / 2 m
- Coordinates: 02°12′31″N 073°09′04″E

Map
- Location in Maldives

Runways
Direction	Length		Surface
Direction	m	ft	Surface
04/22	1,200	3,937	Asphalt

Thimarafushi Airport (IATA: TMF, ICAO: VRNT) is a domestic airport located on the island of Thimarafushi in Thaa Atoll, Maldives. It was constructed by the Maldives Transport and Contracting Company (MTCC); the first aeroplane to land at it did so in a test conducted on 2 September 2013. It was opened on 3 September 2013 by President Mohamed Waheed Hassan.

== Airlines and destinations ==
Airlines	Destinations
Maldivian	Male

== See also ==
- List of airports in the Maldives
- List of airlines of the Maldives
