= Velana International Airport =

Main international airport in the Maldives

Malé-Velana International Airport ވެލާނާ ބައިނަލްއަޤުވާމީ ވައިގެ ބަނދަރު
- IATA: MLE; ICAO: VRMM

Summary
- Airport type: Public/Military
- Owner: Government of the Maldives
- Operator: Maldives Airports Company Limited (MACL)
- Serves: Malé, Maldives
- Location: Hulhulé
- Opened: 12 April 1966; 60 years ago
- Hub for: BeOnd; Maldivian; Trans Maldivian Airways
- Elevation AMSL: 6 ft (1.8 m)
- Coordinates: 04°11′30″N 073°31′44″E
- Website: velana.macl.aero

Maps
- Location of Airport in Hulhulé, Maldives MLE/VRMM (Indian Ocean) MLE/VRMM (Asia)
- Interactive map of Malé-Velana International Airport

Runways
Direction	Length		Surface
Direction	m	ft	Surface
18/36	3,400	11,155	Asphalt
NR/SL	1,190	3,904	Water
NC/SC	1,100	3,609	Water
NL/SR	1,000	3,281	Water
E/W	800	2,625	Water

Velana International Airport (VIA), also known as Malé-Velana International Airport (Dhivehi: ވެލާނާ ބައިނަލްއަޤުވާމީ ވައިގެ ބަނދަރު) (IATA: MLE, ICAO: VRMM) is the main international airport in the Maldives. It is located on Hulhulé Island in Kaafu Atoll, nearby the capital island Malé. The airport is well connected with major airports around the world, mostly serving as the main gateway into the Maldives for tourists. It is managed financially and administratively by a state owned company known as Maldives Airports Company Limited (MACL).

== History ==
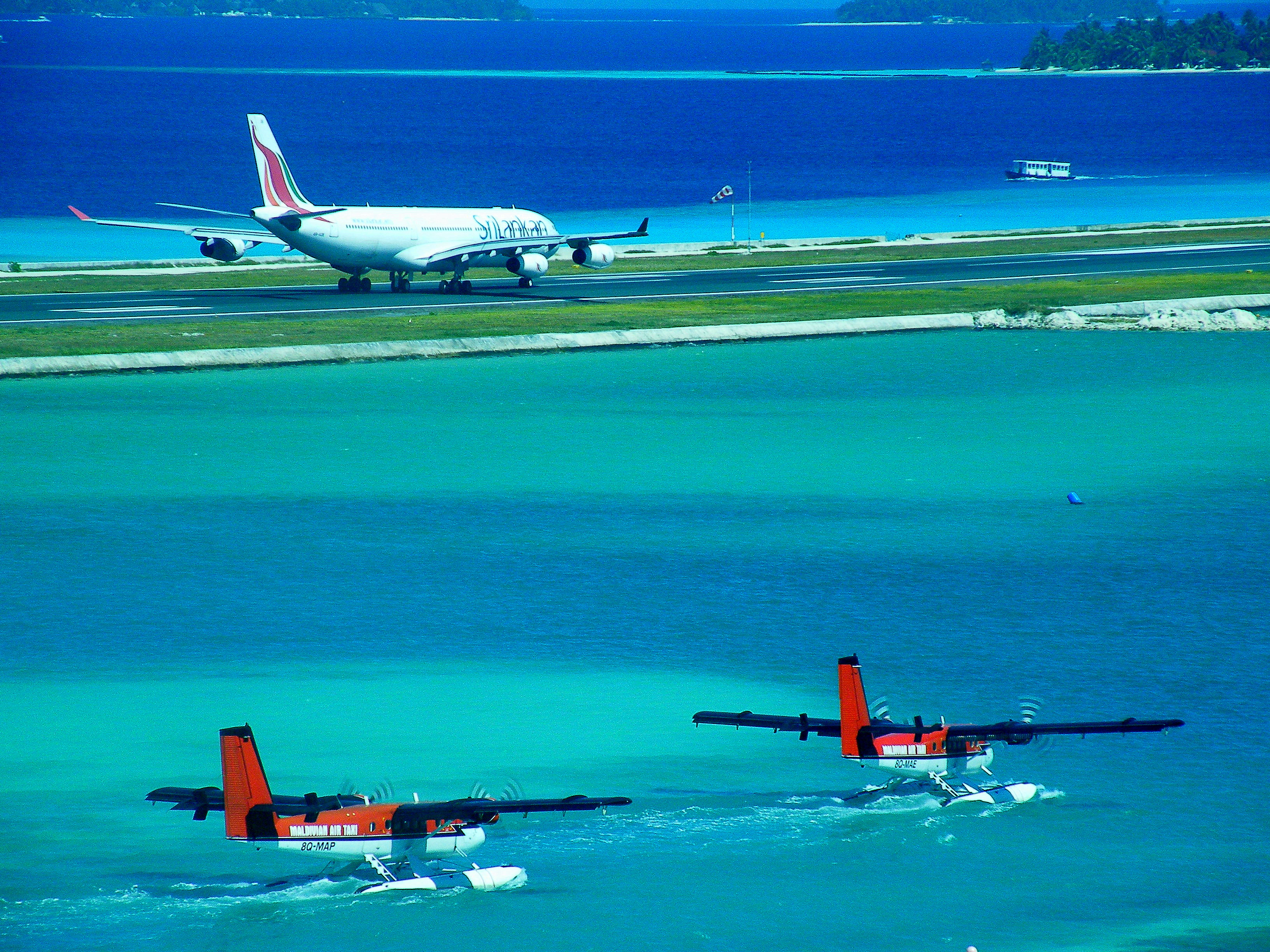
Aircraft on both the runway and the water landing strip

=== Velana International Airport ===
The airport first started out as a small strip of land on the then inhabited island of Hulhulé. Hulhulé Airport was opened on 19 October 1960. The first runway built on Hulhulé Island was made of slotted steel sheets. This runway was 75 ft × 3,000 ft (23 m × 914 m). The first aircraft which landed at the airport was a Royal New Zealand Air Force Bristol Freighter, NZ5906, on 19 October 1960 at 13:55hrs. The first commercial flight was an Air Ceylon flight (Avro 748; 4R-ACJ) landed on this runway was at 15:50hrs on 10 April 1962. The first aircraft owned by the Maldives landed on the runway of the Hulhulé Airport on 9 October 1974.

In May 1964, the government and the people of Malé worked together to construct a new asphalt runway. The four districts of Malé competed for the prize money of 1,000 rufiyaa, awarded to the fastest district. On the first day 150 volunteers were enlisted for the project and 1,563.08 rufiyaa was donated. The new runway was opened on 12 April 1966 at 16:00 by President Ibrahim Nasir.

=== Upgrade to Velana International Airport ===
Maldives Airports Company Ltd (MACL) was formed on 1 January 1994 to operate and manage the Malé International Airport. MACL is governed by the board of directors appointed by the President of the Maldives.

On 1 January 2017, the airport was rebranded as Velana International Airport, referring to the family house name of President Ibrahim Nasir. The rebranding is part of a strategic plan in aligning the airport with the economic vision of the Yameen administration. India has played a crucial role as a key supporter and financier of infrastructure initiatives in the Maldives, serving as a steadfast friend. India's Line of Credit amounting to $136.6 million significantly expedited the successful completion of the Male Airport project.

=== Privatisation of the airport ===
In 2010, the Nasheed administration appointed IFC to run a bidding process for the privatisation of the airport. The bid was won by a consortium between GMR Group and Malaysia Airports who provided 1 billion rufiyaa as upfront fee to the government for the expansion and modernisation of the airport by 2014, and its operation for 25 years.

By the end of the year, MACL officially handed over the aerodrome licence of the airport to the newly formed GMR Malé International Airport Ltd (GMIAL). GMIAL announced that the development plans included reclaiming more land at the eastern end of the runway; where a new terminal is to be built. This terminal would consist of three separate bridged buildings. Plans for a separate cargo terminal were also announced. However, the project faced numerous delays.

In late 2012, the new government of Maldives under the Waheed administration declared that the concession agreement was void ab initio and on 27 November 2012 gave GMIAL a deadline of seven days to 'evict the airport', a decision which drew mass protests from the government's opposition, as well as criticism from the government and media of India. On 7 December, GMR handed over the airport to the government, and MACL was reinstated as the operator.

=== Expansion of the airport ===
On 18 September 2018, the airport finished a new runway. It is 3,400 metres (11,155 ft) long and 60 metres (197 ft) wide, built to serve larger aircraft. The new runway was only used as a taxiway until 2022, when the old Trans Maldivian Airways seaplane terminal - too close to the new runway, and considered a potential hazard under international standards - was finally demolished. Although the new runway was inaugurated on 5 September 2018 by then president of Maldives, Yameen Abdul Gayoom, it was not in use for scheduled flights for 4 years from then until the runway was fully ready.

On 26 June 2019, a Maldivian Airbus A320 successfully tested the new southwest apron at Velana International Airport. This was the first live flight operation testing by Maldives Airports Company as they awaited final certification for operations. On 17 July 2019, the new apron was opened for flight operations. The ICAO fully compliant apron has three Code E MARS stands, two dedicated Code E stands and one dedicated Code C stand.

On 6 October 2022, a new Seaplane Terminal was opened. The terminal was developed by China's Beijing Urban Construction Group (BUCG) at a cost of US$55 million. In the world's largest seaplane operation, the new terminal and dock can accommodate more than 100 seaplanes and operate 300 daily flights on average rising to 600 during peak season with the capacity to serve more than 6,000 tourists a day. With 28,000 square metres (301,389 sq ft) of floor space, the four-storey terminal building includes offices, arrival lobbies, and 42 lounges, most of which are dedicated for resorts aside from the MACL's VIP and business lounges.

The foundation work of the new passenger terminal being constructed at the airport was completed as of December 2019. The new passenger terminal is being developed at the south of the current international terminal and will have an area of over 78,000 square metres (839,585 sq ft). The current terminal was designed to serve 1 million passengers per year while the new terminal will have the capacity to serve 7.5 million passengers per year. Expected completion time of the new terminal is by 2025 and will cost about US$600 million. The project was contracted to the Saudi Bin Laden Group in 2016. The new Terminal is slated for early opening by 26 July 2025, later becoming fully operational by Mid to Late-2025. The new terminal has been funded by the government since 2016 from the Yameen administration, Solih administration, and the Muizzu administration. The expansion project also includes the construction of a cargo terminal and a fuel farm that is expected to be completed in 2020. The current cargo terminal permits the handling of 50,000 tonnes of cargo per year, the new terminal is expected to process 120,000 tonnes of cargo per year. The new fuel farm area is three times larger than the current fuel farm, while the current fuel storage capacity of the entire airport is 15,000 metric tonnes, the fuel storage capacity at the airport would reach 45,000 metric tonne by the end of the project. Under this project, an 8.4-kilometre (5.2 mi) fuel hydrant has been installed under the airport to fuel aircraft. After the system is implemented, fuel trucks will no longer be needed to fuel aircraft, improving safety and shortening service time for the airlines.

The new runway became operational by 6 October 2022, with a Boeing 777 operated by Emirates from Dubai, UAE, landing on the new runway, with the existing runway being converted into a permanent taxiway, as TMA finished moving to the new seaplane terminal by August 2022. The old runway was closed by a departing Turkish Airlines Airbus A330 bound for Istanbul, Turkey. The runway was developed by the BUCG at a cost of US$452 million. With the operationalization of the new runway, the waiting time between landing flights will be decreased from 15 minutes to 3 minutes. The previous runway only accommodated 8 flights per hour, while the new runway can accommodate 21 flights per hour.

In July 2025, the new terminal of the airport was officially opened. The terminal was officially inaugurated by president Mohamed Muizzu. The ceremony included a firework show which landed the airport a Guinness World Record for ""Most Venues Performing Ceremonies and a Choreographed Fireworks Display".

== Facilities ==
The airport is at an elevation of 6 feet (1.8 m) above mean sea level. It has a single asphalt runway designated 18/36 measuring 60 m × 3,400 m (200 ft × 11,150 ft). The adjacent waterdrome which serves the large seaplane operations at Velana has 4 water runways, designated NR/SL, NC/SC, NL/SR and E/W, measuring 60 m × 1,190 m (200 ft × 3,900 ft), 60 m × 1,100 m (200 ft × 3,610 ft), 60 m × 1,000 m (200 ft × 3,280 ft) and 60 m × 800 m (200 ft × 2,620 ft) respectively. Runway NL is takeoff only and runway SR is landing only due to proximities to flying restricted areas.

The airport has three terminals: the International Terminal, the Domestic Terminal and the waterdrome Seaplane Terminal.

The airport includes the corporate headquarters of Trans Maldivian Airways.

== Airlines and destinations ==
=== Passenger ===
Airlines	Destinations
Air Arabia	Sharjah
Air Astana	Seasonal: Almaty; Seasonal charter: Astana
Air France	Seasonal: Paris–Charles de Gaulle
AirAsia	Kuala Lumpur–International
Azerbaijan Airlines	Baku
Batik Air Malaysia	Kuala Lumpur–International
Beijing Capital Airlines	Beijing–Daxing
BeOnd	Dubai–Al Maktoum, Milan–Malpensa, Munich, Red Sea, Zurich
British Airways	London–Heathrow
Centrum Air	Tashkent
China Eastern Airlines	Kunming, Shanghai–Pudong
Chongqing Airlines	Colombo–Bandaranaike
Discover Airlines	Frankfurt
Edelweiss Air	Zurich
Emirates	Dubai–International
Etihad Airways	Abu Dhabi
FitsAir	Colombo–Bandaranaike
Flydubai	Colombo–Bandaranaike, Dubai–International
Flynas	Riyadh
French Bee	Seasonal: Colombo–Bandaranaike, Paris–Orly (begins 19 December 2026)
Greater Bay Airlines	Hong Kong
Gulf Air	Bahrain, Colombo–Bandaranaike
Hong Kong Airlines	Seasonal: Hong Kong
IndiGo	Bengaluru, Cochin, Delhi–Indira Gandhi, Kochi, Mumbai–Shivaji, Thiruvananthapuram; Seasonal: Hyderabad
ITA Airways	Seasonal: Rome–Fiumicino
LOT Polish Airlines	Seasonal charter: Warsaw
Malaysia Airlines	Kuala Lumpur–International
Maldivian	Cochin, Dharavandhoo, Faresmaathodaa, Funadhoo, Fuvahmulah, Gan, Hanimaadhoo, Hoarafushi, Ifuru, Kaadehdhoo, Kadhdhoo, Kooddoo, Kulhudhuffushi Madivaru Maafaru, Maavarula, Muli, Thimarafushi, Thiruvananthapuram; Seasonal: Bangkok–Suvarnabhumi, Shenzhen, Xi'an; Seasonal charter: Melbourne
Manta Air	Dhaalu, Dharavandhoo
Neos	Seasonal: Rome–Fiumicino, Verona; Seasonal charter: Prague, Warsaw–Chopin
Qatar Airways	Doha
S7 Airlines	Novosibirsk
Saudia	Jeddah, Riyadh
Sichuan Airlines	Chengdu–Tianfu
Singapore Airlines	Singapore
SriLankan Airlines	Colombo–Bandaranaike
Thai AirAsia	Bangkok–Don Mueang
Turkish Airlines	Istanbul
US-Bangla Airlines	Dhaka
VietJet Air	Colombo–Bandaranaike (begins 5 December 2026), Hanoi (begins 9 February 2027), Ho Chi Minh City (begins 5 December 2026)
Villa Air	Maamigili
Virgin Atlantic	Seasonal: London–Heathrow

== Statistics ==
=== Busiest international routes from MLE ===
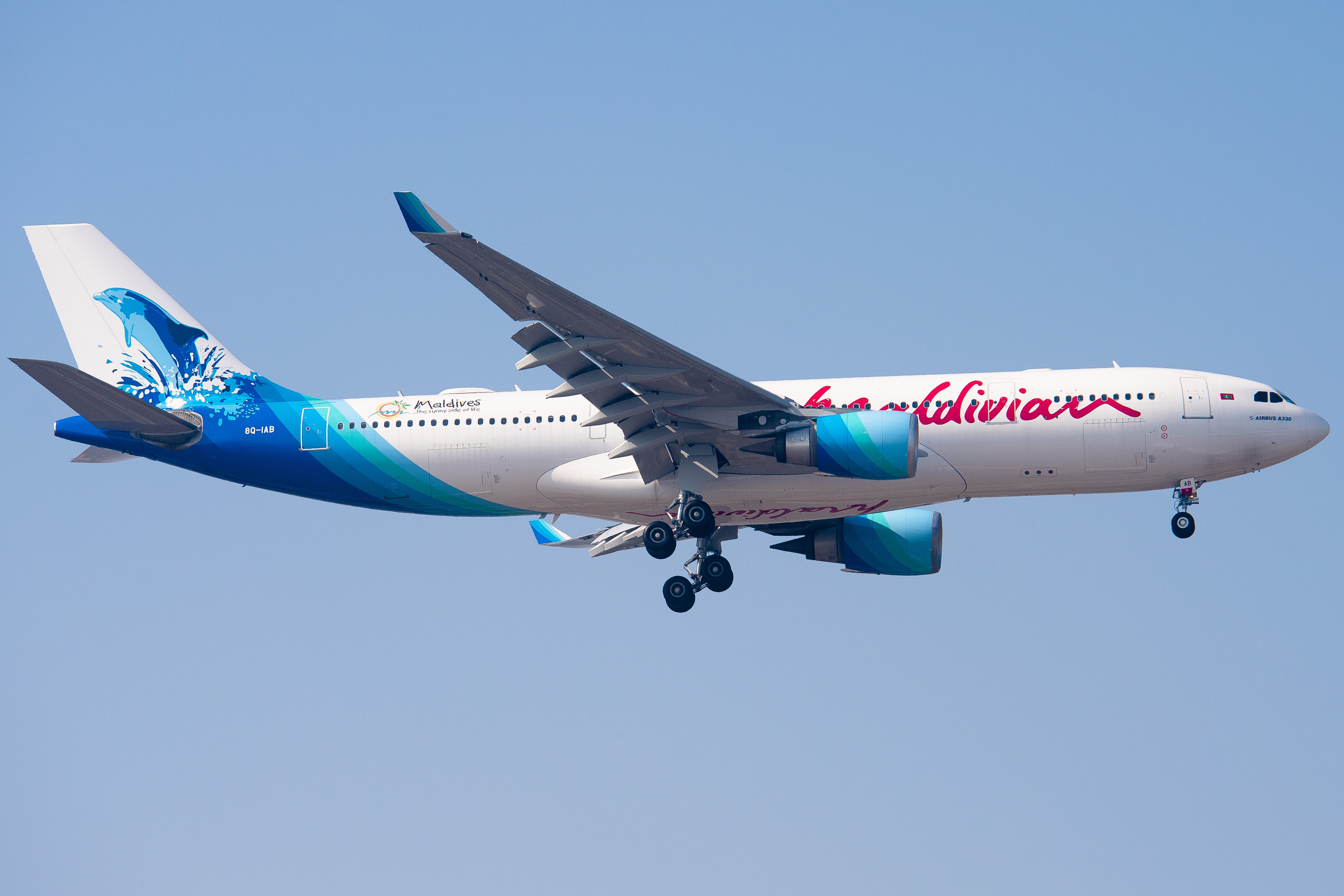
A Maldivian A330, commonly used on flights to Melbourne, Beijing, Shanghai, Kochi and Chengdu

Velana International Airport connects to 67 airports across 28 countries. The routes between Malé (MLE) and Colombo (CMB), Dubai (DXB) and Kuala Lumpur (KUL) are the busiest, with an average of 160 flights operating between these destinations per month.

Busiest international routes from Velana International Airport (MLE) As of September 2026
Rank	Airport	Frequency (monthly)	Carriers
1	(Sri Lanka) Colombo (CMB)	229	Chongqing Airlines, Emirates, FitsAir, Flydubai, Gulf Air, SriLankan Airlines
2	(United Arab Emirates) Dubai (DXB)	148	Emirates, Flydubai
3	(Malaysia) Kuala Lumpur (KUL)	104	AirAsia, Batik Air Malaysia, Malaysia Airlines
4	(United Arab Emirates) Abu Dhabi (AUH)	83	Etihad Airways
5	Singapore (SIN)	62	Singapore Airlines
5	(Qatar) Doha (DOH)	62	Qatar Airways
7	(India) Kochi (COK)	54	IndiGo, Maldivian
8	(United Arab Emirates) Sharjah (SHJ)	46	Air Arabia
9	(Russia) Moscow (SVO)	40	Aeroflot
9	(India) Trivandrum (TRV)	40	IndiGo, Maldivian

== Incidents and accidents ==
- On 18 October 1995 a Dornier 228 (9M-PEQ) operated by Air Maldives (leased from Pelangi Air) abruptly turned right, left the runway, struck the seawall and somersaulted into the adjacent lagoon while landing. The plane was written off. Of the eight on board, three were injured but there were no fatalities.
- On 17 May 2004 a Trans Maldivian Airways de Havilland Canada DHC-6 Twin Otter Series 300, (AC 434) collided with the sea-wall of runway 18 after experiencing problems taking off from the seaplane base. Both pilots and one passenger were seriously injured in the accident. The aircraft was written off.

== See also ==
- List of airports in Maldives
