= Muli Airport =

Airport in Muli, the Maldives

Muli Airport މުލި އެއާޕޯޓް
- IATA: MUM; ICAO: VRKM

Summary
- Airport type: Public
- Owner: Regional Airports Company Limited
- Operator: Regional Airports Company Limited
- Serves: Muli
- Location: M. Muli
- Coordinates: 02°54′41″N 073°34′55″E
- Website: airports.mv

Map
- Location in Maldives

Runways
Direction	Length		Surface
Direction	m	ft	Surface
09/19	1,500	4,921	Asphalt
- Sources: IATA

Muli Airport (IATA: MUM, ICAO: VRKM) is a domestic airport located on Muli, one of the islands of the Meemu Atoll in Maldives. A test flight landed at Muli Airport on 25 April 2025. Maldives Transport and Contracting Company (MTCC) was contracted the MVR 540 million project to develop the airport terminal and fire building.

== Airlines and destinations ==
The airport currently serves two commercial destinations.

Airlines	Destinations
Maldivian	Kadhdhoo, Malé

== See also ==
- List of airports in the Maldives
- List of airlines of the Maldives
