= Kulhudhuffushi Airport =

- IATA: HDK; ICAO: VRBK

Summary
- Airport type: Public
- Operator: Regional Airports Company Limited
- Serves: Northern Maldive Atolls
- Location: Kulhudhuffushi, Haa Dhaalu Atoll, Maldives
- Elevation AMSL: 3 ft / 1 m
- Coordinates: 06°37′52″N 073°04′00″E

Map
- Location in Maldives

Runways
Direction	Length		Surface
Direction	m	ft	Surface
12/30	1,220	4,003	Asphalt
- Source: DAFIF

Kulhudhuffushi Airport (IATA: HDK, ICAO: VRBK) is an airport located on the city of Kulhudhuffushi in Haa Dhaalu Atoll, Maldives. The construction of the airport began on 28 October 2017 and it was officially opened on 21 September 2018, while commercial operations began on 9 August 2019.

== Facilities ==
The airport resides at an elevation of 1 metre (3 ft 3 in) above mean sea level. It has one runway designated 12/30 with an asphalt surface measuring 1,220 by 30 metres (4,003 ft × 98 ft).

== Airlines and destinations ==
Airlines	Destinations
Maldivian	Dharavandhoo, Ifuru, Malé
