= Maldivian (airline) =

Airline of the Maldives

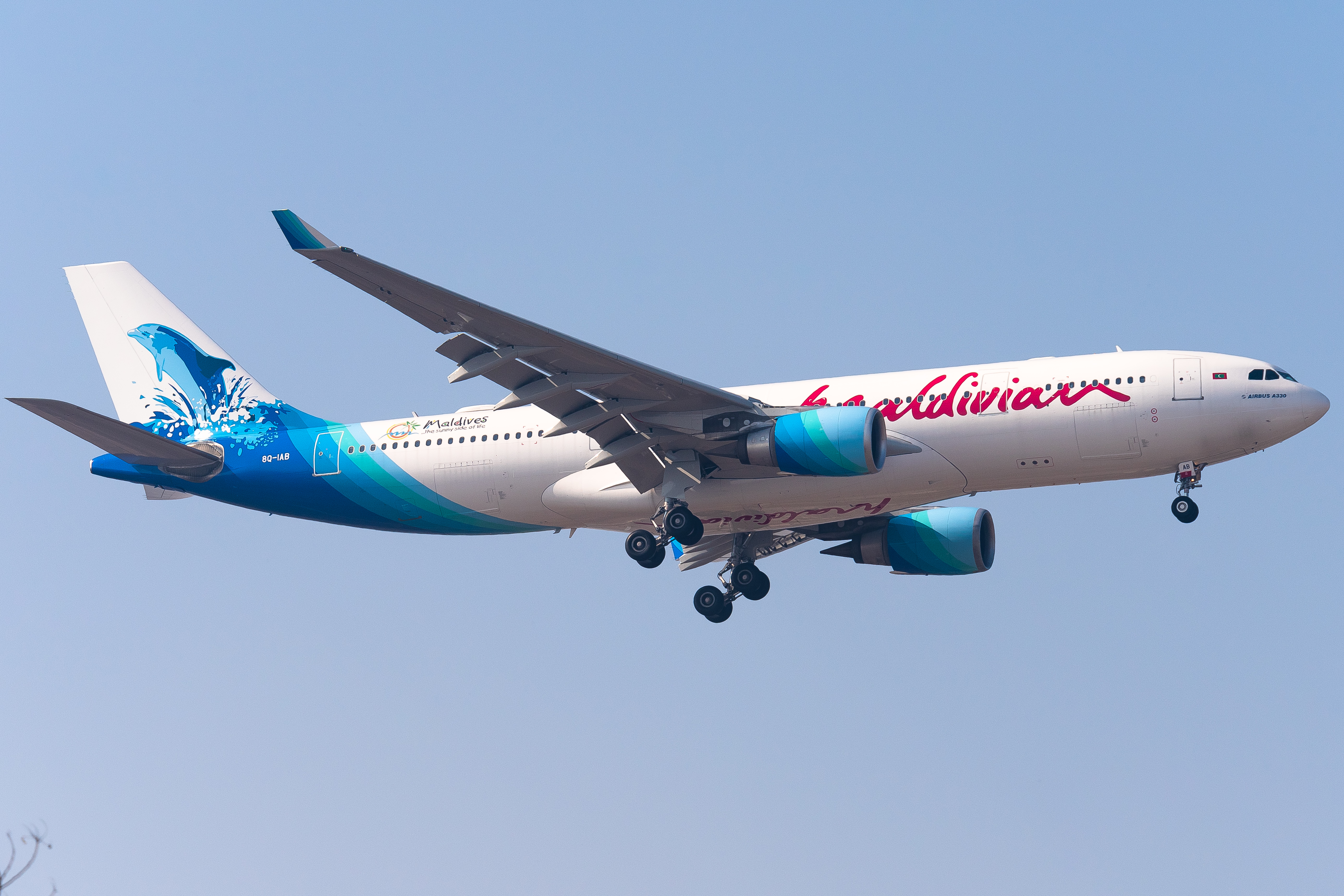
- A Maldivian Airbus A330-200
IATA	ICAO	Call sign
Q2	DQA	SKY SURFER
- Founded: 13 April 2000; 26 years ago (as Island Aviation Services); 25 August 2008; 18 years ago (as Maldivian)
- Hubs: Velana International Airport
- Fleet size: 25
- Destinations: 33
- Parent company: Island Aviation Services (Maldivian state-owned corporation)
- Headquarters: Malé
- Employees: 4500+
- Website: www.maldivian.aero

Maldivian is the airline division of Island Aviation Services and is based in Malé, Maldives. As the flag carrier of the Maldives, they operate international flights in addition to inter-island services, with its main hub at Velana International Airport.

== History ==
On 23 April 2009, the Maldivian government, under a Presidential decree, incorporated Island Aviation Services Limited as a wholly government-owned limited company. The airline began operations with a fleet comprising one Bombardier Dash 8 Q200 and two Dornier 228 aircraft, serving only domestic airports within the Maldives. International operations commenced on 26 January 2008, with scheduled flights to Thiruvananthapuram, India. On 25 August 2008, the airline division was rebranded as Maldivian.

In 2023, Maldivian started using new generation ATR 72-600 and ATR 42-600 aircraft in its fleet, replacing its older Dash 8 aircraft. On 6 January 2025, Maldivian introduced its first widebody aircraft, an Airbus A330-200, with plans to add a second A330 and a Boeing 787-8. The airline is also seeking destinations in Europe, Africa, and Asia. The inaugural flight was to Chengdu in China.

== Destinations ==
Maldivian flies to the following destinations on scheduled domestic and international service as of January 2025:

Domestic and international destinations
Country	City	Airport	Notes	Ref
Australia	Melbourne	Melbourne Airport	Seasonal charter	
China	Beijing	Beijing Capital International Airport		
China	Chengdu	Chengdu Tianfu International Airport		
China	Shanghai	Shanghai Pudong International Airport	Terminated	
China	Shenzhen	Shenzhen Bao'an International Airport	Seasonal	
China	Xi'an	Xi'an Xianyang International Airport	Seasonal	
India	Bengaluru	Kempegowda International Airport	Terminated	
India	Kochi	Cochin International Airport		
India	Trivandrum	Thiruvananthapuram International Airport		
Maldives	Dharavandhoo	Dharavandhoo Airport		
Maldives	Faresmathoda	Faresmathoda Airport		
Maldives	Funadhoo	Funadhoo Airport		
Maldives	Fuvahmulah	Fuvahmulah Airport		
Maldives	Gan	Gan International Airport		
Maldives	Hanimaadhoo	Hanimaadhoo International Airport		
Maldives	Hoarafushi	Hoarafushi Airport		
Maldives	Ifuru	Ifuru Airport		
Maldives	Kaadedhdhoo	Kaadedhdhoo Airport		
Maldives	Kadhdhoo	Kadhdhoo Airport		
Maldives	Kooddoo	Kooddoo Airport		
Maldives	Kulhudhuffushi	Kulhudhuffushi Airport		
Maldives	Maafaru	Maafaru International Airport		
Maldives	Maavarulu	Maavarulu Airport		
Maldives	Madivaru	Madivaru Airport		
Maldives	Malé	Velana International Airport	Hub	
Maldives	Thimarafushi	Thimarafushi Airport		
Maldives	Muli	Muli Airport		
Thailand	Bangkok	Suvarnabhumi International Airport	Seasonal	

Maldivian seaplane operating destinations
Country	Atoll	Resort	Notes	Ref
Maldives	Baa Atoll	Anathara Kihavahuravalhi		
Maldives	Baa Atoll	Four Seasons Private Island		
Maldives	Baa Atoll	Hirundu Island Resort		
Maldives	Baa Atoll	Vakkaru Island Resort		
Maldives	Baa Atoll	Kamadhoo		
Maldives	Baa Atoll	Fulhadhoo		
Maldives	Dhaalu Atoll	Doores Island Retreat		
Maldives	Dhaalu Atoll	Kandima Island Resort		
Maldives	Dhaalu Atoll	Maagau Island Resort		
Maldives	Dhaalu Atoll	Niyaama Private Islands		
Maldives	Noonu Atoll	Robinson Club Noonu		
Maldives	Noonu Atoll	Velidhoo		
Maldives	Raa Atoll	Kudafushi Island Resort		
Maldives	Thaa Atoll	Maalifushi Island Resort		

=== Codeshare agreements ===
Maldivian has codeshare agreements with the following airline:

- Qatar Airways

=== Interline agreements ===
Maldivian has interline agreements with the following airlines:

- Air India
- Azerbaijan Airlines
- Emirates
- Etihad Airways

== Fleet ==
=== Fleet development ===
In 2000, Island Aviation Services operated one De Havilland Canada Dash 8-200 and two Dornier 228s at the time, and in late 2004, they ordered one De Havilland Canada Dash 8-200 to expand the fleet. In 2006, the airline ordered two Dash 8-300s. The first aircraft delivery was in 2007, and the other in 2008. In 2006, all Dornier 228 aircraft were phased out. In 2008, Island Aviation Services re-branded as Maldivian and handed over as the flag carrier of the Maldives. In 2011, the airline ordered one Airbus A320-200 for wider routes, with it being delivered in 2012. In late 2012, a new Dash 8-300 was delivered. In 2013, they ordered five more Dash 8-300s, with the final being delivered in 2018. In 2014, Maldivian introduced the de Havilland Canada DHC-6 Twin Otter, with their last one being delivered in 2018. Later in 2014, Maldivian ordered one Airbus A321-200. In late 2022, the A321 retired. In early 2023, Maldivian had taken delivery of three ATR aircraft and ordered five more aircraft. In July 2024, Maldivian ordered their first wide-body aircraft, the Airbus A330-200, being delivered on 6 January 2025.

=== Current fleet ===
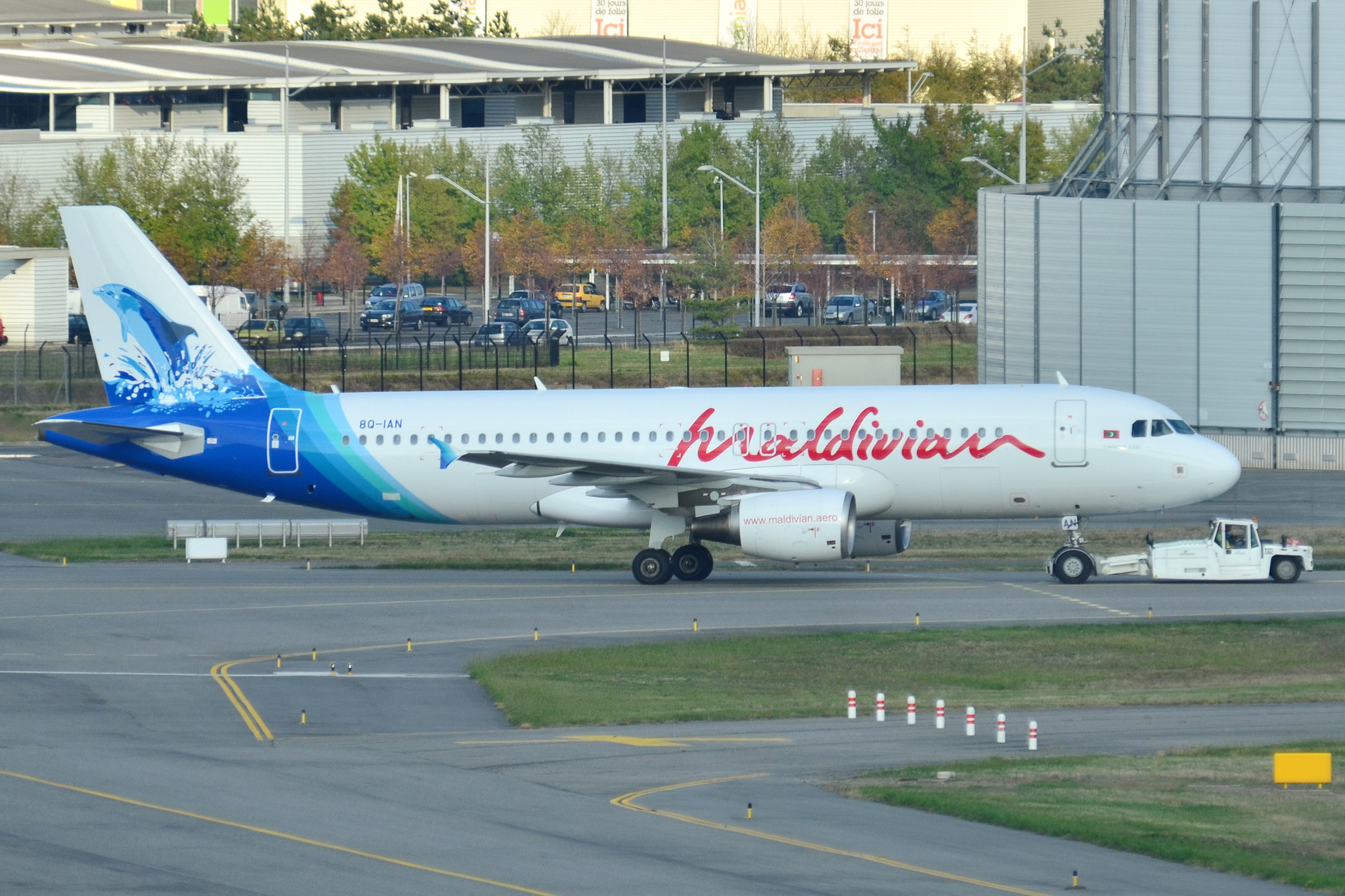
Maldivian A320-200

As of November 2026, Maldivian operates the following aircraft:

Maldivian fleet
Aircraft	In service	Order	Passengers					Notes
Aircraft	In service	Order	F	C	W	Y	Total	Notes
Airbus A320-200	1		—	14	—	138	152	Deliveries from 2025.
Airbus A330-200	1	1	—	18	36	210	264	Deliveries from October 2025.
ATR 42-600	3	2	—	—	—	46	46	Deliveries from 2024 to 2026.
ATR 72-600	2	—	—	—	—	70	70	
De Havilland Canada DHC-6-300	11	2	—	—	—	15	15	Seaplane service.
De Havilland Canada Dash 8-300	2	—	—	—	—	50	50	To be phased out.
Beechcraft King Air 360	1		—	—	—	—	—	Luxury resort service
Total	23	5						

Maldivian medevac fleet
Aircraft	In service	Order	Passengers	Remarks
De Havilland Canada Dash 8-200	1	—	Medevac	As Maldives Emergency Medical Services (MEMS).

=== Former fleet ===
Maldivian historic fleet
Aircraft	Total	introduced	Retired	Replacement aircraft	Remark
Airbus A321-200	1	2015	2022	—	—
ATR 72-500	1	2022	2023	ATR 72-600	Leased from Swiftair due to delay of new ATR 72-600 aircraft deliveries.
De Havilland Canada Dash 8-300	7	2007	2024	ATR 42/72	One sold, one scrapped and one in storage.
De Havilland Canada Dash 8-200	1	2000	2024	ATR 42/72	—
de Havilland Canada DHC-6-300	2	2014	2017	—	—
de Havilland Canada DHC-6-200HG	1	2015	2017	—	—
Dornier 228	2	2000	2012	Dash 8	-
Total	9				

== Livery ==
The first livery used by the airline (Island Aviation) featured a wave pattern along the bottom of the fuselage along with two dolphins and two tuna fish. The logo was placed in the center of the tail. Along with the re-branding of Maldivian, a new livery was introduced. The new livery saw the removal of the wave pattern to a plain white fuselage, and the addition of a blue wave, with one dolphin jumping out of the water on the tail of the aircraft.

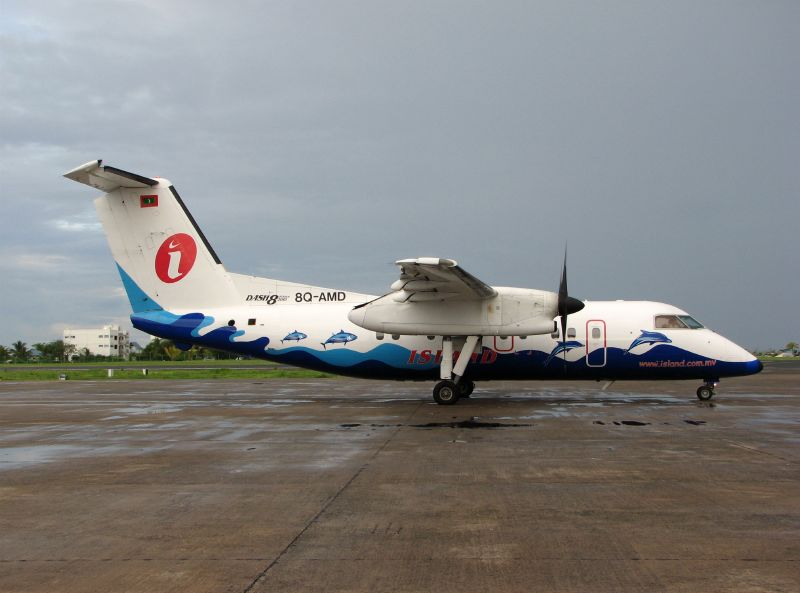
Former livery used by the airline (as Island Aviation).

== Other services ==
As of June 2024, Island Aviation Services provides the following services at all public airports of the Maldives.

- Aircraft engineering services
- Ground control
- Flight operations
- Aerodrome operation
- Refueling services

== Lounges ==
Maldivian operates three lounges in the Maldives: Moonimaa lounge at Malé and Kashimaa lounges at both Hanimaadhoo and Dharavandhoo airports.
