= Funadhoo Airport =

- IATA: FND; ICAO: VRCF

Summary
- Airport type: Public
- Owner: Government of Maldives
- Operator: Regional Airports Company Limited; Ground: Island Aviation Services
- Serves: Funadhoo, Shaviyani Atoll, Maldives
- Elevation AMSL: 6 ft / 2 m
- Coordinates: 06°09′40″N 073°17′14″E

Map
- Location in Maldives

Runways
Direction	Length		Surface
Direction	m	ft	Surface
02/20	1,100	3,609	Asphalt
- Source: IATA, Maldivian, STV,

Funadhoo Airport (IATA: FND, ICAO: VRCF) is a domestic airport located on the island of Funadhoo in Shaviyani Atoll, Maldives. The first test flight to Funadhoo airport landed on January 24, 2020. The country's national airline, Maldivian (airline) commenced scheduled direct flights to Funadhoo island in Shaviyani atoll on February 3, 2020. According to the Ministry of Transport and Civil Aviation, three flights are scheduled to land every week when operations begin at Funadhoo Airport. The scheduled flights are expected to increase to three flights a day once March 2020 reaches an end.

== History ==
Funadhoo airport was long-awaited dream of people residing in Funadhoo and nearby islands. Land reclamation for the airport project in Funadhoo was initially started before the Local Council Elections in July 2017, but was later halted. Six months later Maldives Transport and Contracting Company's Trailing Suction Hopper Dredger, “Mahaa Jarraaf” docked in Funadhoo on 15 January 2018, and started land reclamation for the island's airport development project. The land reclamation project for Funadhoo Airport was completed on 27 March 2018. A sum of 21 hectares of land was reclaimed from the west of the island's northern side for the development of domestic airport.

== Facilities ==
The airport resides at an elevation of 6 feet (2 m) above mean sea level. The Funadhoo Airport has a 1,200-meter-long and 30-meter-wide runway, coupled with a 90-meter taxiway and a 150-meter-long and 50-meter wide apron, Surface: Asphalt, Strength: PCN15/F/B/X/T

Construction is complete on the airport terminal building, but remains ongoing on the fire building and fire pond.

== Airlines and destinations ==
Airlines offering scheduled passenger service:

Airlines	Destinations
Maldivian	Malé

== See also ==
- List of airports in the Maldives
- List of airlines of the Maldives
