= Cam Ly Airport =

Airport in Lâm Đồng Province, Vietnam

Cam Ly Airport Sân bay Cam Ly
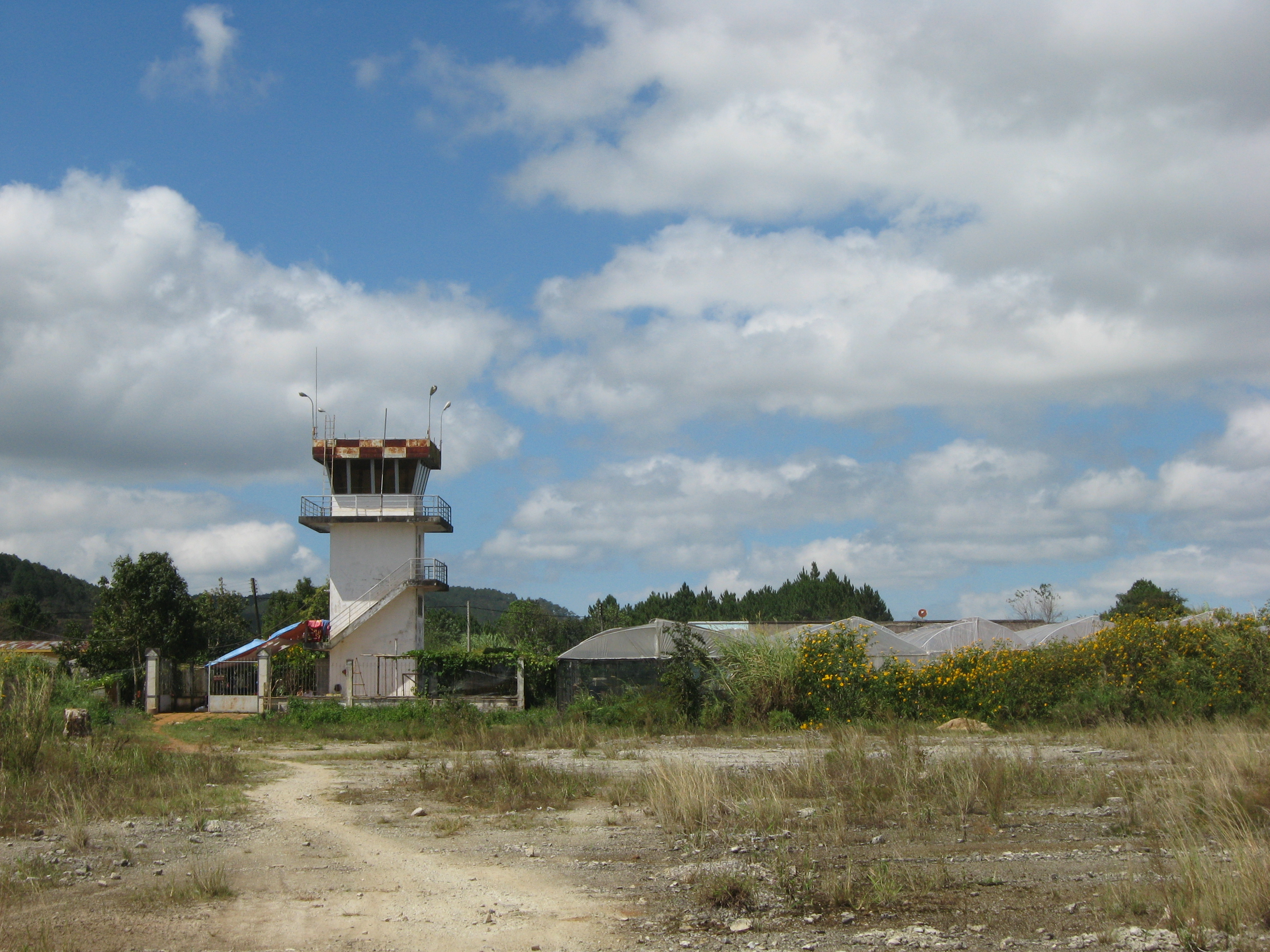
- IATA: none; ICAO: VVCL

Summary
- Airport type: Public
- Operator: Southern Airports Authority
- Location: Da Lat
- Elevation AMSL: 4,937 ft / 1,505 m
- Coordinates: 11°56′34″N 108°24′54″E
- Interactive map of Cam Ly Airport

Runways
Direction	Length		Surface
Direction	ft	m	Surface
10L/28R	4,560	1,390	Asphalt

Cam Ly Airport (IATA: N/A, ICAO: VVCL) (Vietnamese: Sân bay Cam Ly) is a small abandoned airport outside of Da Lat in Lâm Đồng Province in the Central Highlands region of Vietnam. It is the former site of Vietnamese National Military Academy. It was mainly used for military purposes and also served small aircraft including sport airplanes and helicopters.

The former airport site is currently used for growing crops and livestock farming.

== See also ==
- List of airports in Vietnam
