= Hanimaadhoo =

Hanimaadhoo ހަނިމާދޫ
- Inhabited island
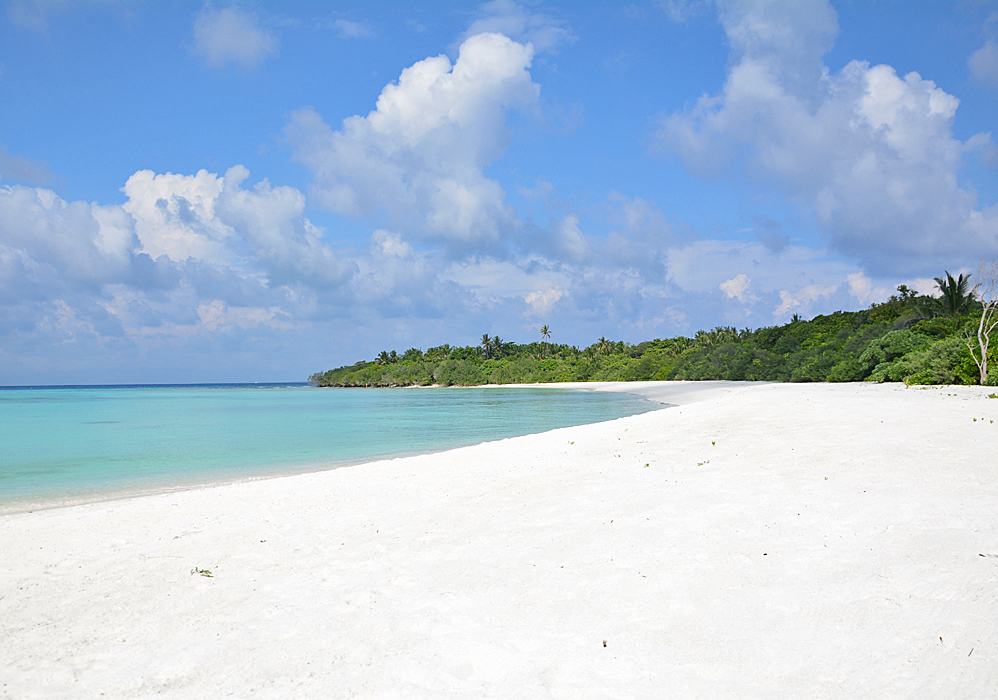
- Beach, north Hanimaadhoo

- Location in Maldives
- Coordinates: 06°45′57″N 73°10′33″E
- Country: Maldives
- Geographic atoll: Thiladhummathi Atoll
- Administrative atoll: Haa Dhaalu Atoll
- Distance to Malé: 288.84 km (179.48 mi)

Dimensions
  - Length: 6.800 km (4.225 mi)
  - Width: 0.730 km (0.454 mi)

Population (2022)
  - Total: 2,664
- Time zone: UTC+05:00 (MST)

Hanimaadhoo (Dhivehi: ހަނިމާދޫ) is one of the inhabited islands of Haa Dhaalu Atoll administrative division and geographically part of Thiladhummathi Atoll in the north of the Maldives.

== Geography ==
The island is 288.84 km (179 mi; 156 nmi) north of the country's capital, Malé.

=== Climate ===
The Hanomaadhoo Meteorological Observatory is located on this island. Many flight scientific research such as those investigating aerosol concentrations in the atmosphere and the Brown Cloud phenomenon have been initiated from Hanimaadhoo.

On 27 February 2025, Hanimaadhoo recorded a temperature of 35.8 °C (96.4 °F), which is the highest temperature to have ever been recorded in the Maldives.

Climate data for Hanimaadhoo International Airport, (elevation 1.4 m (4.6 ft), 1991−2020 normals)
Month	Jan	Feb	Mar	Apr	May	Jun	Jul	Aug	Sep	Oct	Nov	Dec	Year
Mean daily maximum °C (°F)	30.8 (87.4)	31.2 (88.2)	32.1 (89.8)	32.6 (90.7)	32.0 (89.6)	31.0 (87.8)	30.7 (87.3)	30.6 (87.1)	30.7 (87.3)	30.8 (87.4)	30.8 (87.4)	30.7 (87.3)	31.2 (88.2)
Daily mean °C (°F)	27.9 (82.2)	28.2 (82.8)	29.1 (84.4)	29.8 (85.6)	29.5 (85.1)	28.8 (83.8)	28.4 (83.1)	28.3 (82.9)	28.3 (82.9)	28.2 (82.8)	28.1 (82.6)	28.0 (82.4)	28.6 (83.5)
Mean daily minimum °C (°F)	24.5 (76.1)	24.6 (76.3)	25.6 (78.1)	26.6 (79.9)	26.5 (79.7)	25.8 (78.4)	25.4 (77.7)	25.5 (77.9)	25.4 (77.7)	25.2 (77.4)	24.8 (76.6)	24.6 (76.3)	25.4 (77.7)
Average precipitation mm (inches)	38.7 (1.52)	29.4 (1.16)	32.7 (1.29)	67.2 (2.65)	234.5 (9.23)	229.2 (9.02)	260.5 (10.26)	221.5 (8.72)	174.3 (6.86)	198.5 (7.81)	172.4 (6.79)	107.8 (4.24)	1,766.7 (69.56)
Average precipitation days (≥ 0.1 mm)	3.0	2.7	2.9	5.5	13.4	17.1	16.3	15.0	13.1	12.8	10.5	7.3	119.6
Source: NOAA

== Demography ==
Islanders from Hathifushi and Hondaidhoo have been relocated to Hanimaadhoo in the recent years.

Historical population
Year	Pop.	±%
2006	1,184	—
2014	1,618	+36.7%
2022	2,664	+64.6%
2006-2014: Census populations Source:

== Economy ==
The island is planned to be one of the developmental centres of the newly planned Mathi-Uthuru Province.

== Tourism Sector ==
The island is slowly developing into a tourist hot spot North Of the Maldives.

Currently hanimaadhoo have several guest houses, which caters to national and international tourists.

This change is due to the New Upgraded Hanimaadhoo Airport having flights to India's Cochin (Kochi), Bengaluru, and Trivandrum (Thiruvananthapuram).

== Transport ==
The island is the site of Hanimaadhoo Airport, one of the few international airports of the Maldives.

== Gallery ==
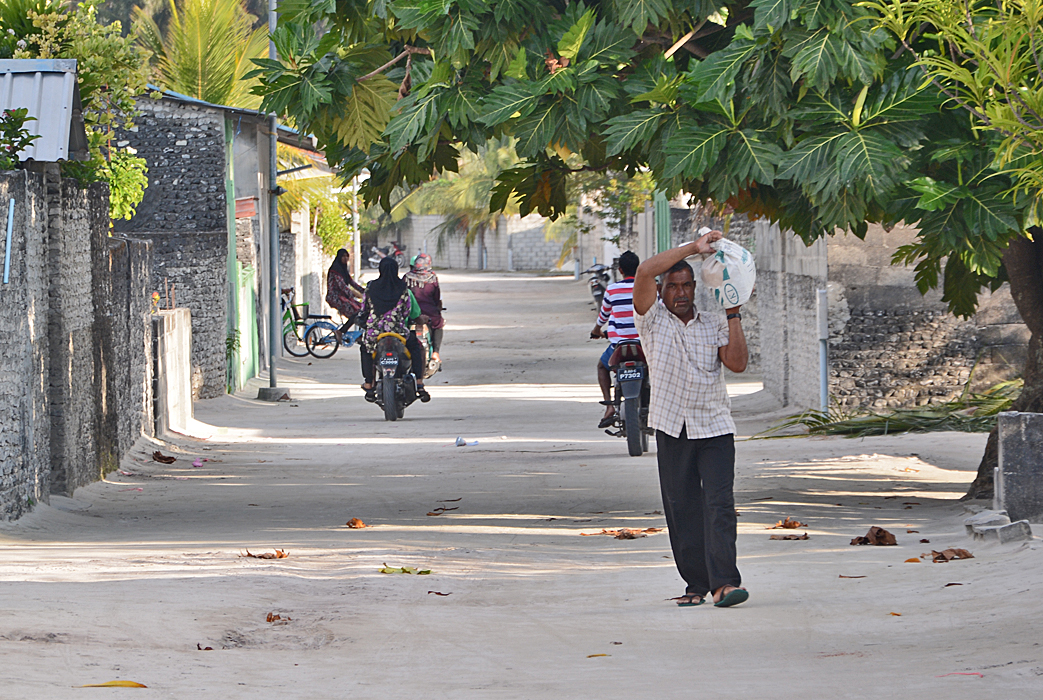
Main street

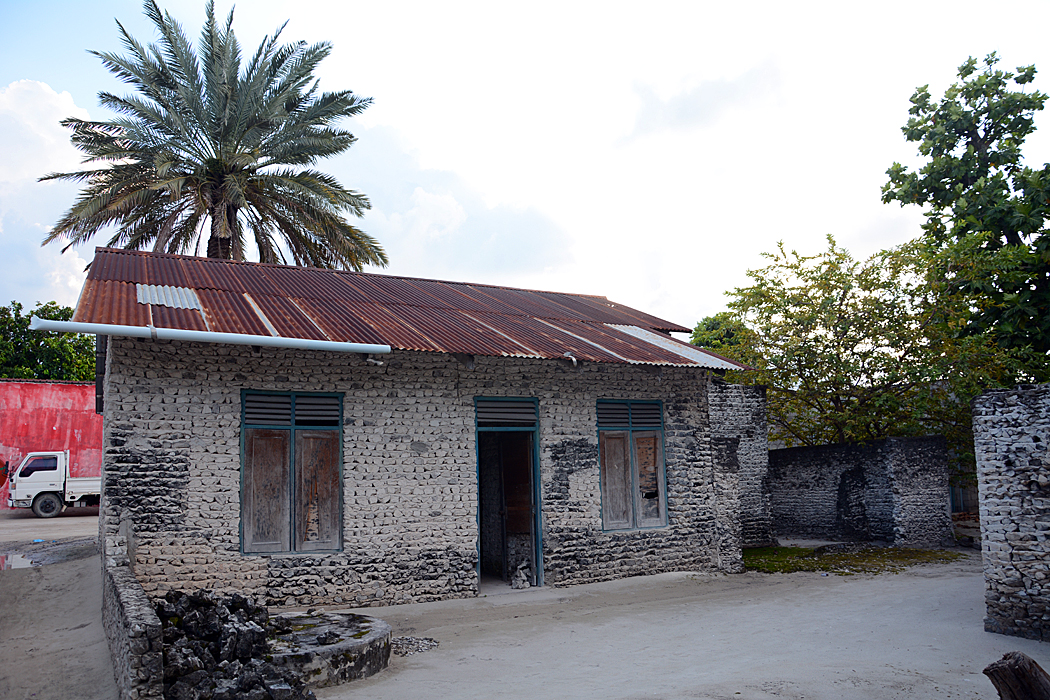
Old house made of coral bricks

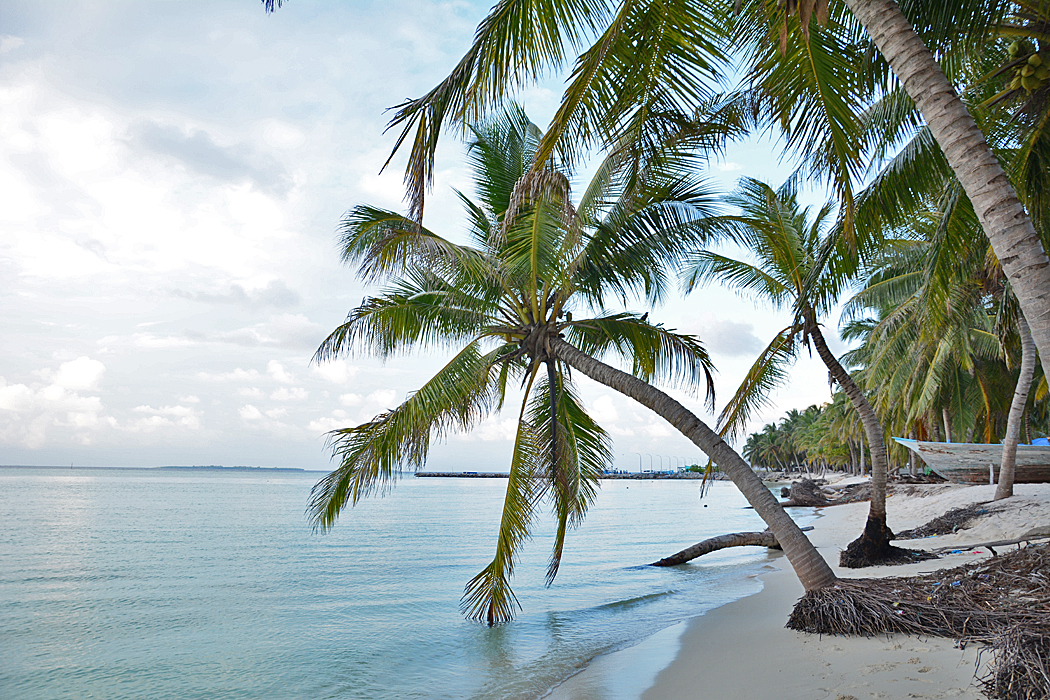
West coast

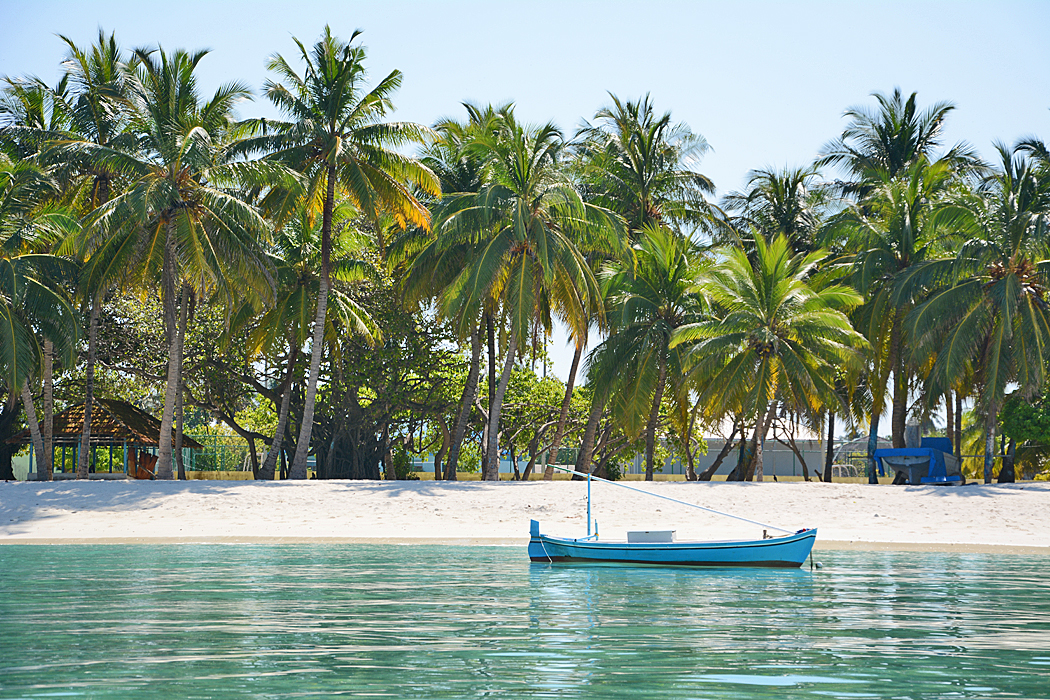
West coast

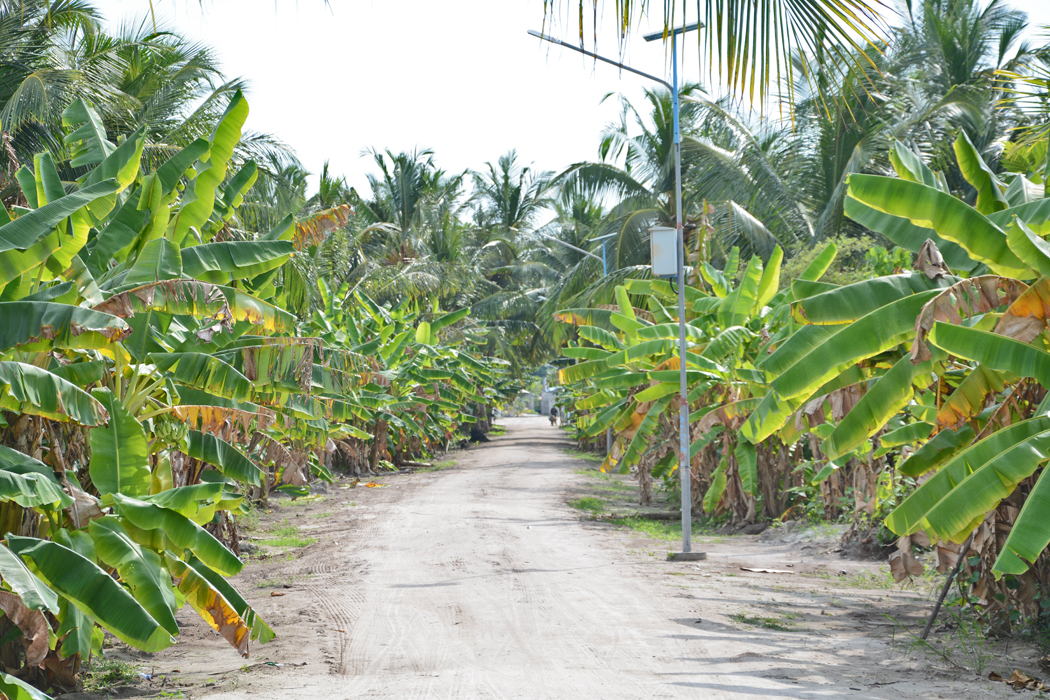
Banana plant alley, north island
