= Hanimaadhoo International Airport =

Airport in Haa Dhaalu Atoll, Maldives

Hanimaadhoo International Airport ހަނިމާދޫ ބައިނަލްއަޤުވާމީ ވައިގެ ބަނދަރު
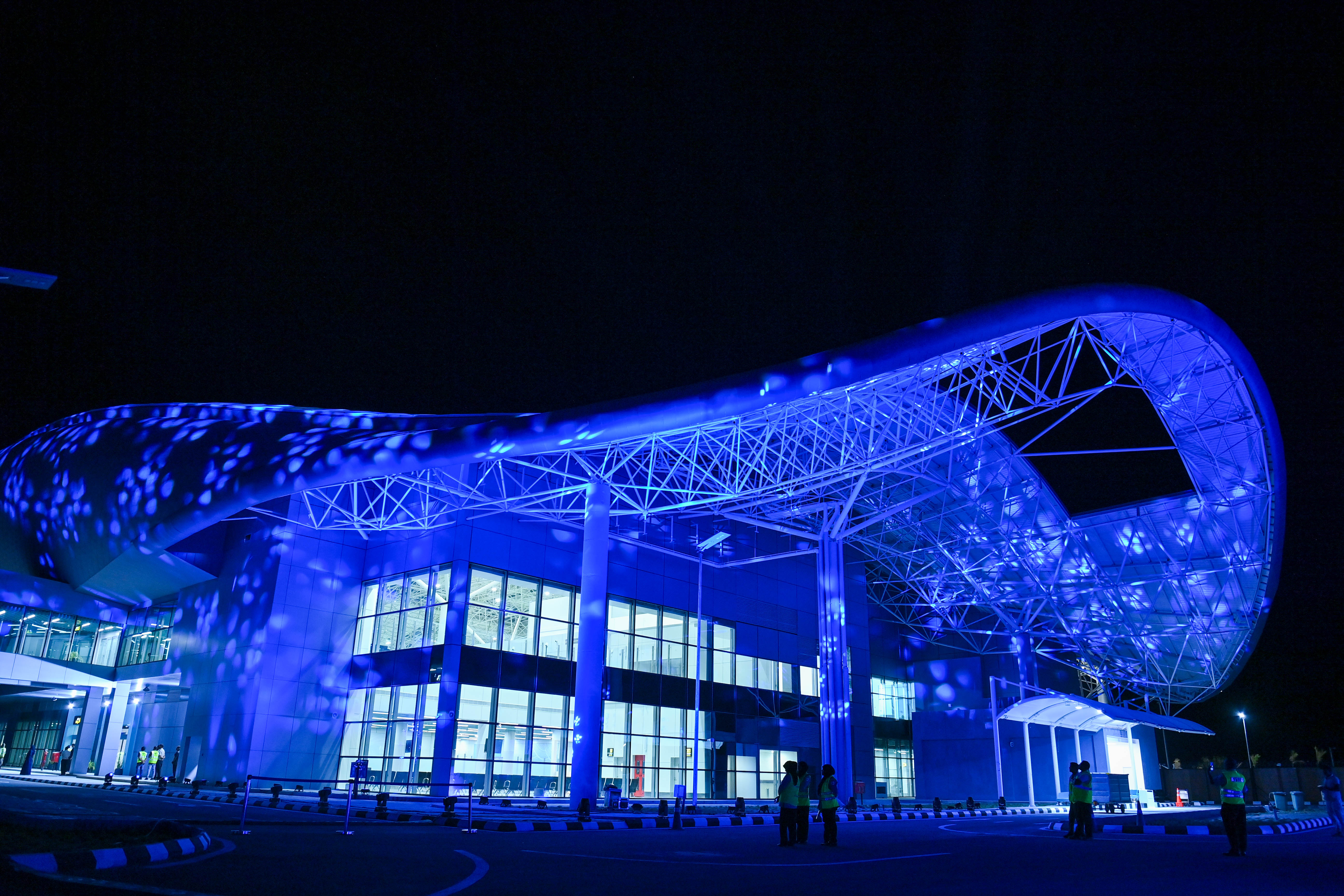
- IATA: HAQ; ICAO: VRMH

Summary
- Airport type: Public
- Operator: Regional Airports Company Limited
- Serves: Northern Maldive Atolls
- Location: Hanimaadhoo, Haa Dhaalu Atoll, Maldives
- Elevation AMSL: 3 ft (0.91 m)
- Coordinates: 06°44′39″N 073°10′13″E
- Website: airports.com.mv/...

Maps
- Location in Maldives
- Interactive map of Hanimaadhoo International Airport

Runways
Direction	Length		Surface
Direction	m	ft	Surface
03/21	2,465	8,087	Asphalt
- Source: DAFIF

Hanimaadhoo International Airport (Dhivehi: ހަނިމާދޫ ބައިނަލްއަޤުވާމީ ވައިގެ ބަނދަރު IATA: HAQ, ICAO: VRMH) is an airport located on the island of Hanimaadhoo in Haa Dhaalu Atoll, Maldives, opened as a domestic airport. It was upgraded to an international airport on 2 February 2012, with the introduction of direct flights to Thiruvananthapuram in India by Maldivian. As of June 2019, it is one of three international airports in the Maldives.

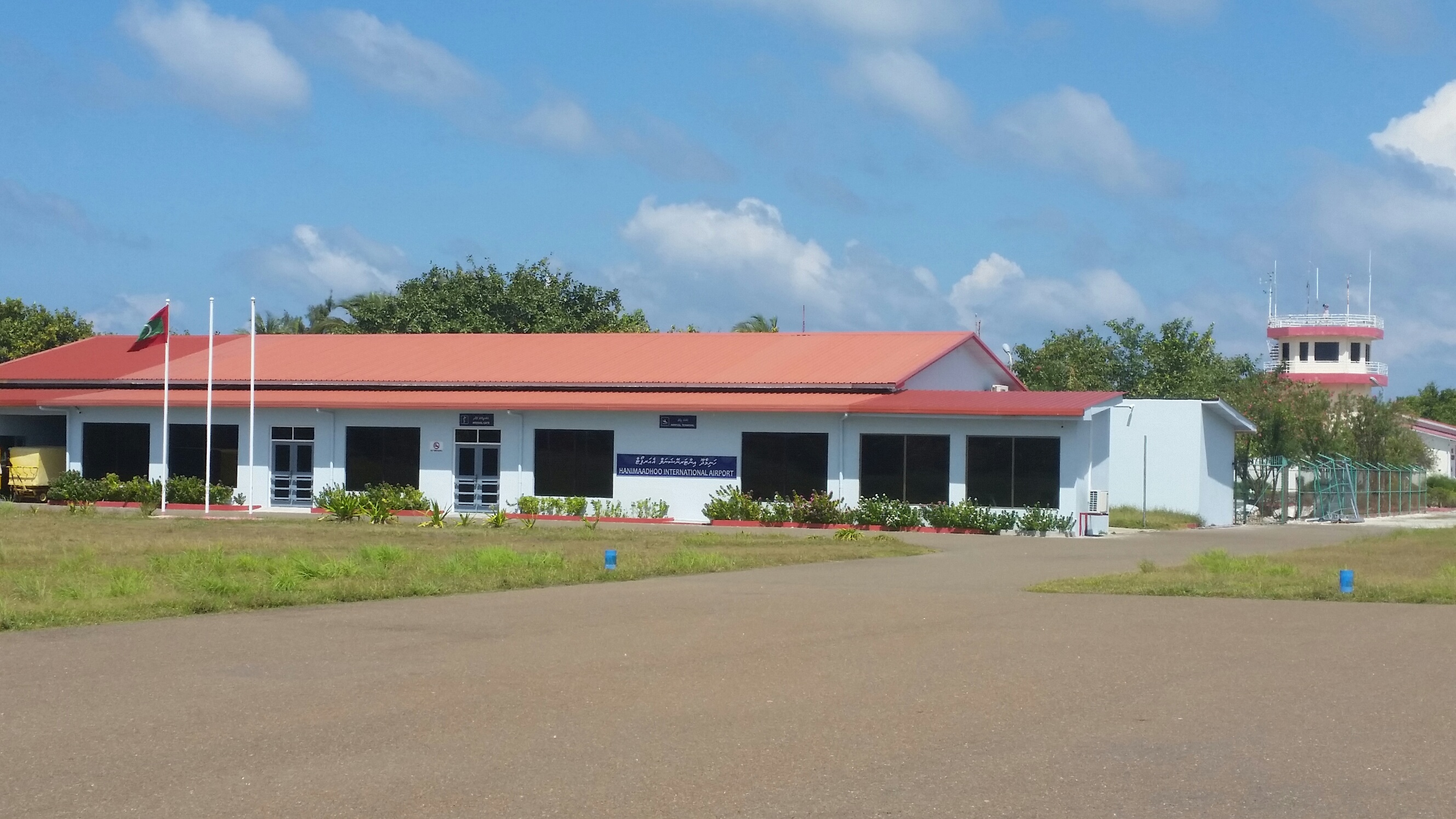
Hanimaadhoo Airport in 2014

== Facilities ==
The airport is at an elevation of 3 feet (1 m) above mean sea level. It has one runway designated 03/21 with an asphalt surface measuring 1,220 by 30 metres (4,003 ft × 98 ft). A huge airport expansion project was announced in 2021 with the line of credit facility from Export Import Bank of India.

== Airlines and destinations ==
Airlines	Destinations
Maldivian	Bengaluru, Dharavandhoo, Ifuru, Malé, Thiruvananthapuram; Seasonal: Kochi
