= Madivaru Airport =

- IATA: LMV; ICAO: VRGD

Summary
- Airport type: Public
- Operator: Island Aviation Services Limited
- Serves: Naifaru, Lhaviyani Atoll, Maldives
- Location: Madivaru, Lhaviyani Atoll, Maldives
- Elevation AMSL: 6 ft / 2 m
- Coordinates: 5.4574°N 73.3701°E

Map
- Location in Maldives

Runways
Direction	Length		Surface
Direction	m	ft	Surface
18/36	1,200	3,937	Asphalt

Madivaru Airport (IATA: LMV) is an airport on Madivaru, Lhaviyani Atoll, Maldives.

The island was previously used for military training. In May 2018 the government contracted Kuredu Holdings (the developer of Kuredu island) to develop an airport. The project required reclaiming three hectares of land. The construction contractor was Beijing Urban Construction Group (BUCG).

It is operated by Island Aviation Services Limited (IASL).

== See also ==
- List of airports in the Maldives
