= Ifuru Airport =

Domestic Airport in Maldives

Coordinates: 5°42′50″N 73°1′50″E

- IATA: IFU; ICAO: VREI

Summary
- Elevation AMSL: 6 ft / 2 m

Map
- Interactive map of Ifuru Airport

Runways
Direction	Length		Surface
Direction	ft	m	Surface
18/36	3,937	1,200	Asphalt

Ifuru Airport (IATA: IFU, ICAO: VREI) is a domestic airport located in the Ungoofaaru area in Maldives. It is an operational public airport.

== Specifications ==
Ifuru Airport is at an elevation of 6 ft (2m) from the mean sea level. It has one runway with length 1200m and direction 18/36. The runway has an asphalt surface.

The airport caters small island-hopping flights.

== Airlines and destinations ==
Airlines	Destinations
Maldivian	Hanimaadhoo, Malé
