= List of airlines of the Maldives =

This is a list of airlines operating in the Maldives.

== Scheduled airlines ==
Airline	Image	IATA	ICAO	Callsign	Commenced operations	Notes
BeOnd		B4	BYD	BEOND	2023	International carrier
Villa Air		VP	VQI	VILLA AIR	2011	Domestic airline
Maldivian		Q2	DQA	ISLAND AVIATION	2000	National airline of Maldives
Manta Air		NR	MAV	Sea Wings	2016	Domestic airline
Trans Maldivian Airways		M8	TMW	TRANS MALDIVIAN	1989	Sea plane service

== See also ==
- List of airlines
- List of defunct airlines of Maldives
- List of defunct airlines of Asia
