= Rādavaḷi =

Maldivian historical text

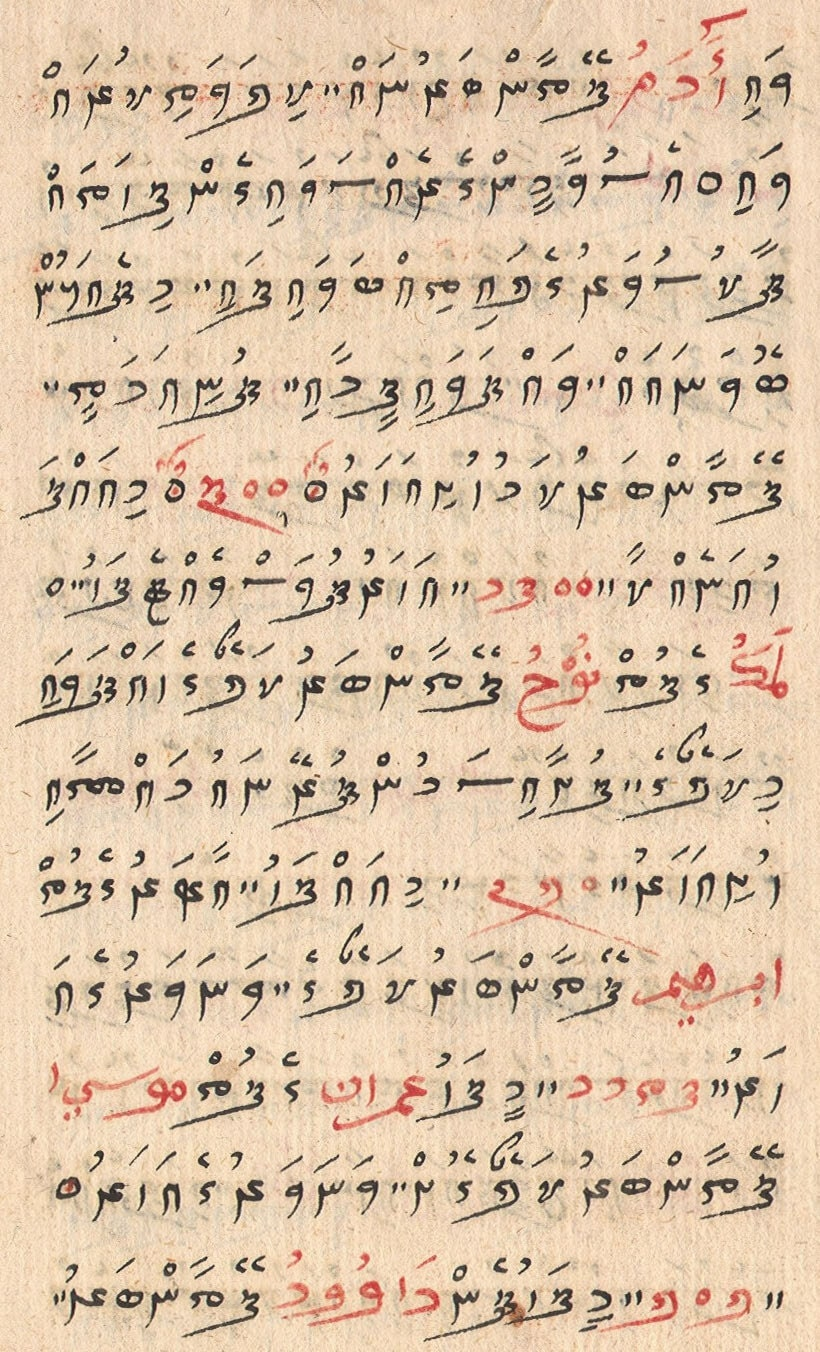
Raadhavalhi C, page 2. Written in early Thaana script (black ink) with old dhivehi numerals and Arabic names written in red ink. This page mentions the story of Prophethood from Prophet Adam to Prophet David.

Raadhavalhi (Dhivehi: ރާދަވަޅި), also romanized as Rādavaḷi, is a Maldivian historical text that details information about Maldivian monarchs up to the 18th century. According to British archaeologist HCP Bell, Raadhavalhi was written in Dhives Akuru script, as well as a combination of old Thaana script and Arabic.

== See also ==
- Maldivian writing systems
- List of Maldivian monarchs
- Loamaafaanu
