= Gan (Laamu Atoll) =

- Inhabited island
- Location in Maldives
- Coordinates: 01°54′55″N 73°32′35″E
- Country: Maldives
- Administrative atoll: Laamu Atoll
- Distance to Malé: 249.93 km (155.30 mi)

Dimensions
  - Length: 7.800 km (4.847 mi)
  - Width: 3.400 km (2.113 mi)

Population (2022)
  - Total: 4,815
- Time zone: UTC+05:00 (MST)

Gan (Dhivehi: ގަން) is one of the inhabited islands of Haddhunmathi Atoll, administrative code Laamu and the proposed capital for the Mathi-Dhekunu Province of the Maldives. It is the largest island in the Maldives.

== History ==
=== Archaeology ===
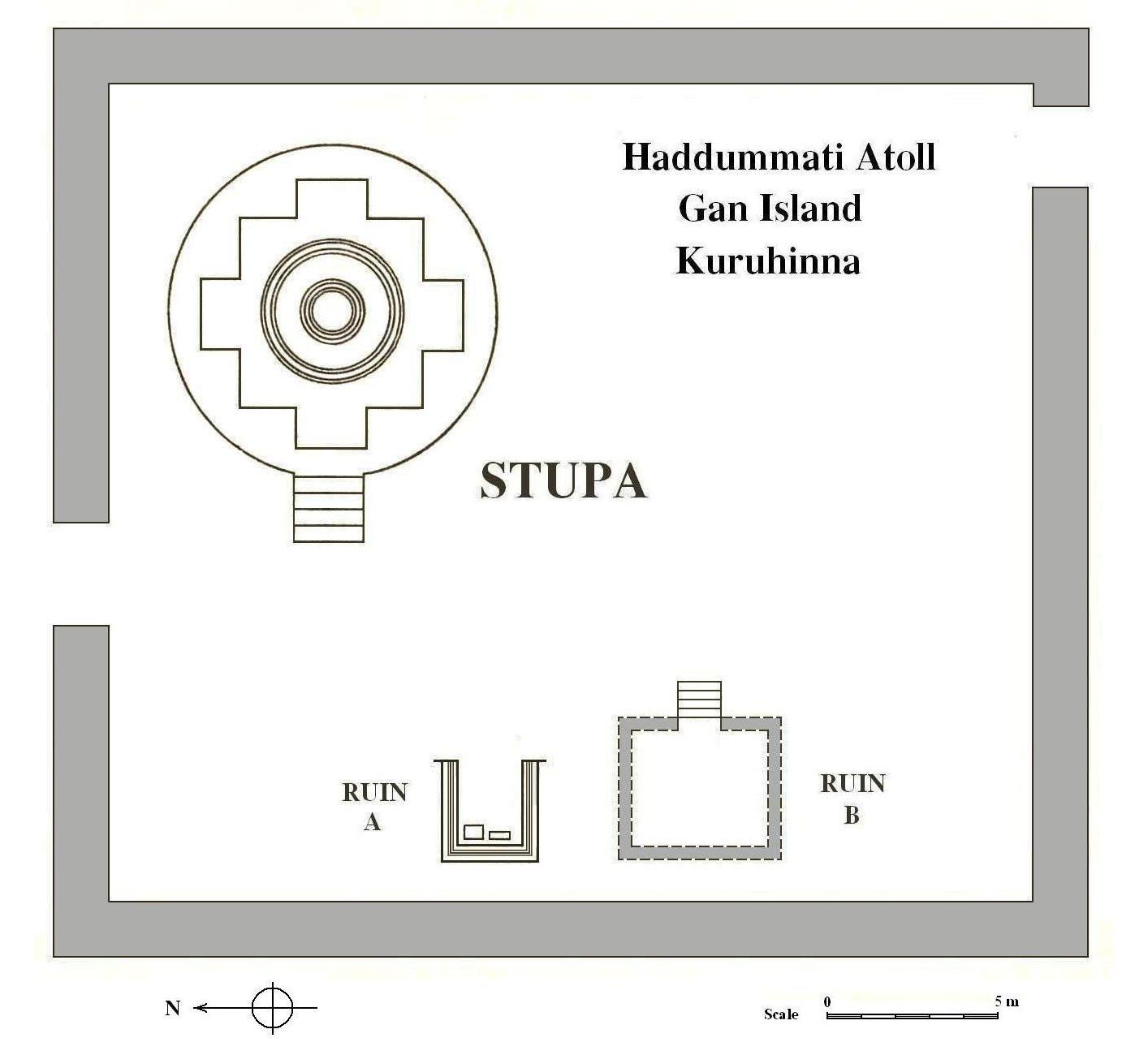
The temple compound at one of the Buddhist sites in Gan Island

Gan Island has large ruins from the historical Maldivian Buddhist era.

- A ruin called "Gamu Haiytheli" is situated on Mudhin Hinna in the Mukurimagu ward of the island. It is 91.5 metres (300 ft) in circumference and 7.3 m (24 ft) in height. Local tradition says that this was the last Buddhist temple of the Maldives.
- Ruins called "Munbaru" in an area called Kuruhinna. These were investigated by H. C. P. Bell in 1923 and a report with photographs was published in his monograph of 1940.

The ruins in Gan were the best preserved ruins from the Buddhist past in the Maldives when Bell excavated some of the island's Buddhist remains, especially one of the stupas and a vihara at Kuruhinna. Recently, however, much vandalism has taken place at those unprotected sites and only scattered stones and mounds of coral rubble remain.

== Geography ==
The island is 249.93 km (155 mi; 135 nmi) south of the country's capital, Malé. Gan, combined with the adjoining island of Maandhoo, is the largest geographical island of the Maldives. It is divided in wards, the northernmost of which is called Thundi, in middle is Mathimaradhu and at the south is Mukurimagu. Gan is connected with Maandhoo, the island to its south. Maandhoo is linked with the regional domestic airport at Kadhdhoo by a short causeway. Kadhdhoo adjoins at its south with Fonadhoo, the capital of the atoll. The causeway, which links between Kadhdhoo and Fonadhoo, is almost one kilometre in length. The four islands of Gan, Maandhoo, Kadhdhoo and Fonadhoo, which is linked with causeways, stretches up to about 18 km (11 mi) in length, making up the longest length of dry land in the Maldives.

== Demography ==
Historical population
Year	Pop.	±%
2006	2,502	—
2014	2,809	+12.3%
2022	4,815	+71.4%
2006-2014: Census populations Source:

== Economy ==
=== Development ===
Gan is the most developed island in the atoll. After the 2004 tsunami the French Red Cross and other foreign governments built new buildings, including a new school, a multi-purpose building, a new hospital, bank, primary and secondary schools, water plant, police station and power houses.

=== Health Facility ===
Gan Regional Hospital provides health services to all the people residing in the South Central Province. The hospital started as an Atoll Health Centre on 7 November 1993. The demand for services increased and it expanded to an Atoll Hospital on 11 June 2001. Further upgrades took place in the form of facilities and staff. On 1 August 2002, it achieved Regional Hospital status. Gan Regional Hospital serves as the highest referral centre for South Central Province.

== In popular culture ==
Laamu Atol was used as a filming location for Rogue One: A Star Wars Story (2016), serving as the setting for the planet Scarif. Scenes were filmed on Baresdhoo Island, Kudafushi Island, Kudarah Island, and Gan Island.

== See also ==
- History of Maldives
