= Hussain Nihan =

Maldivian footballer

Personal information
- Full name: Hussain Nihan
- Date of birth: 6 July 1992 (age 34)
- Place of birth: L. Maabaidhoo, Maldives
- Position: Midfielder

Team information
- Current team: Maziya
- Number: 8

Youth career
- 2012: Club Eagles

Senior career*
Years	Team	Apps	(Gls)
2012	Club Eagles		
2013–2014	Victory		
2015–2017	Club Valencia		
2018–2019	Victory		
2019–	Maziya		

International career^{‡}
2018–	Maldives	45	(1)
- * Club domestic league appearances and goals ‡ National team caps and goals as of 5 July 2026

Hussain Nihan (born 6 July 1992), known as Niheart, is a Maldivian professional footballer who plays as a midfielder for Maziya.

== Career ==
Nihan started his career as a 19 year old teenager at Club Eagles in 2012. He joined Victory Sports Club in the year 2013 and went on to play for them until signing for Club Valencia in 2015. Nihan played a vital role in Valencia's 2016 Maldives FA Cup win, helping them to lift the FA Cup trophy after 12 years. Following a successful three years at Club Valencia, Nihan again signed for Victory Sports Club in 2018. His display at Victory earned him his first national team call-up.

On 6 March 2019, Nihan joined Maziya on a three-year deal.

== International ==
Nihan was first called up for Maldives national football team in 2018, making his debut in an international friendly against Singapore, replacing Mohamed Umair at stoppage time in the second half. Maldives lost the match 3-2, at the National Stadium, Singapore.

His first tournament action was at 2018 SAFF Championship. Despite being an unused sub in the group stage, he started in the semi-final and final against Nepal and India respectively. 2018 SAFF Championship Final against India was his first 90 minutes in national colors, in which the Maldives beat India 2-1, to become the second nation to win the tournament more than once.

== Career statistics ==
=== International ===
As of match played on 18 November 2025

Appearances and goals by national team and year
National team	Year	Apps	Goals
Maldives	2018	4	0
Maldives	2019	7	0
Maldives	2020	–	
Maldives	2021	9	0
Maldives	2022	8	1
Maldives	2023	6	0
Maldives	2024	2	0
Maldives	2025	9	0
Total		45	1

Scores and results list Maldives's goal tally first, score column indicates score after each Nihan goal.

List of international goals scored by Hussain Nihan
No.	Date	Venue	Opponent	Score	Result	Competition
1	24 September 2022	Track & Field Sports Complex, Bandar Seri Begawan, Brunei	Laos	3–1	3–1	Friendly

== Honours ==
Maldives

- SAFF Championship: 2018
