= Dhanbidhoo =

- Inhabited island
- Location in Maldives
- Coordinates: 02°05′40″N 73°32′45″E
- Country: Maldives
- Administrative atoll: Laamu Atoll
- Distance to Malé: 230.13 km (143.00 mi)

Dimensions
  - Length: 2.020 km (1.255 mi)
  - Width: 0.350 km (0.217 mi)

Population (2014)
  - Total: 647 (including foreigners)
- Time zone: UTC+05:00 (MST)

Dhanbidhoo or Dambidū (according to the Admiralty Charts) (Dhivehi: ދަނބިދޫ) is one of the inhabited islands of Haddummati Atoll, administrative code Laamu.

== History ==
This island has large ruins from the historical Maldivian Buddhist era.

=== Dambidū Lōmāfānu ===
Lōmāfānu are ancient royal edicts written on copper plates. Lōmāfānu edicts were etched on long copper plates held together by a ring of the same metal. The lōmāfānu were written in the curly Evēla form of the Divehi akuru or old Maldive alphabet and they are very important documents in the History of the Maldives. The oldest lōmāfānu that have hitherto been found and preserved are from Malé, the royal capital, and from the islands of Isdū and Dambidū in Haddummati Atoll, where there were large Buddhist monasteries. These copperplates were issued at the end of the twelfth century AD. Thanks to the lōmāfānu it is also known that the monasteries in Haddummati Atoll were of great importance in the ancient Buddhist Kingdom of the Maldives.

In the Dambidū lōmāfānu the king of Maldives (Radun) addresses his edict to all islands between Kelā (in Tiladummati Atoll), one of the northernmost islands of the group, and Addu (Atoll) in the southern end. This (lōmāfānu), makes it clear that the general conversion from Buddhism to Islam was ordered by the king. The Dambidū lōmāfānu tells us also that Satihirutalu (the Chatravali crowning a stupa) were broken to disfigure the numerous stupas. It tells us also that statues of Vairocana, the transcendent Buddha of the middle world region, were destroyed; and the destruction was not limited to sculptures.

== Geography ==
The island is 230.13 km (143 mi; 124 nmi) south of the country's capital, Malé.

== Demography ==
Historical population
Year	Pop.	±%
2006	537	—
2014	622	+15.8%
2006-2014: Census populations Source:
