= Kudahuraa =

Kudahuraa may refer to the following places in the Maldives:

- Kudahuraa (Kaafu Atoll)
- Kudahuraa (Laamu Atoll)
