= Fushi Kandu =

Channel

Fushi Kandu is a Channel located in the north eastern side of Laamu atoll, the Channel is located in between the island of Maabiadhoo and Fushi (an Un inhabited island) Fushi Kandu offeres a great hotspot for Scuba divers and Great surf spot for the Surfers.

The dive site offers to vast array of marine life including Sharks, Sea turtles, Snappers and Trevallies. depends on the current the dive site offers extra large number of grey reef sharks, whitetip reef sharks and eagle rays gather in the front of the channel when the current is incoming, incoming is when the oceanic current flows from outside of the atoll through the channel to inside of the atoll.
