= Mundoo =

Mundoo is the name of several geographic localities:

- Mundoo (Laamu Atoll), an island in the Maldives
- Mundoo, Queensland, a town in Australia
- Mundoo Island, South Australia, an island in Lake Alexandrina and a locality in the Alexandrina Council
