= Laamu =

Laamu (kingdom in Fula language) may refer to:

- Laamu Atoll, an administrative division of the Maldives
- Laamu, the 14th consonant of the Thaana abugaida used in Dhivehi

== See also ==
- Lamu
