= Maldivian writing systems =

Writing systems used in the Maldives

Several Dhivehi scripts have been used by Maldivians during their history. The early Dhivehi scripts fell into the abugida category, while the more recent Thaana has characteristics of both an abugida and a true alphabet. An ancient form of Nagari script, as well as the Arabic and Devanagari scripts, have also been extensively used in the Maldives, but with a more restricted function. Latin was official only during a very brief period of the Islands' history.

The first Dhivehi script likely appeared in association with the expansion of Buddhism throughout South Asia. This was over two millennia ago, in the Mauryan period, during emperor Ashoka's time. Manuscripts used by Maldivian Buddhist monks were probably written in a script that slowly evolved into a characteristic Dhivehi form. Few of those ancient documents have been discovered and the early forms of the Maldivian script are only found etched on a few coral rocks and copper plates.

== Ancient scripts (Evēla Akuru) ==
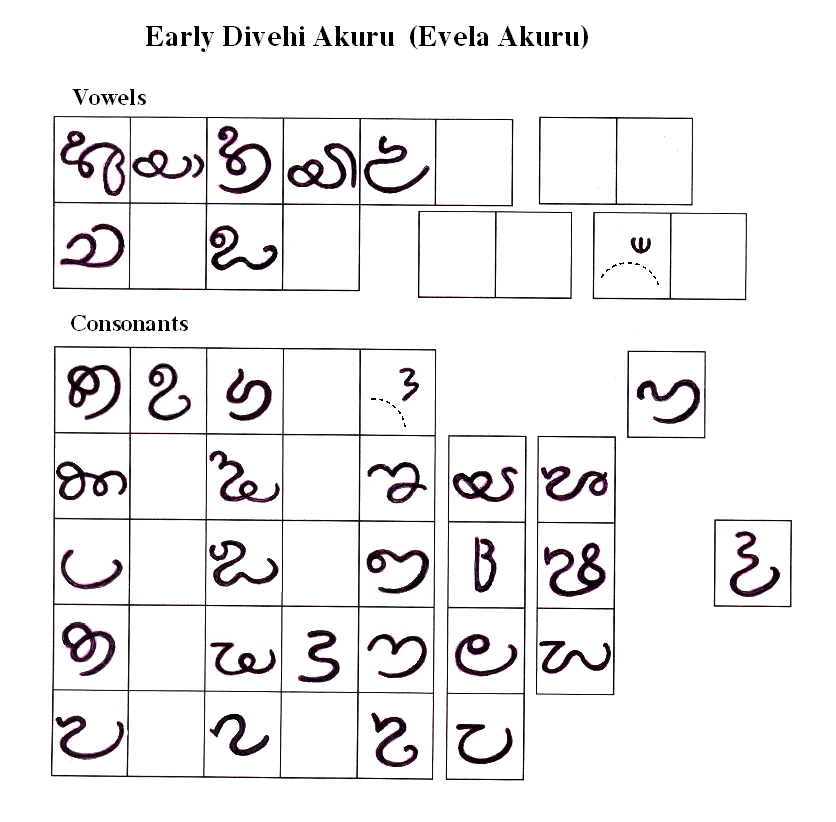
Chart of early Dives Akuru by Xavier Romero-Frias.

Dhivehi Akuru "island letters" is a script formerly used to write the Dhivehi language. Unlike the modern Thaana script, Divehi Akuru has its origins in the Brahmi script and thus was written from left to right.

Dhivehi Akuru was separated into two variants, a more recent and an ancient one and christened "Dives Akuru" and "Evēla Akuru" respectively by Harry Charles Purvis Bell in the early 20th century. Bell was British and studied Maldivian epigraphy when he retired from the colonial government service in Colombo.

Bell wrote a monograph on the archaeology, history and epigraphy of the Maldives. He was the first modern scholar to study these ancient writings and he undertook an extensive and serious research on the available epigraphy. The division that Bell made based on the differences he perceived between the two types of Dhivehi scripts is convenient for the study of old Dhivehi documents.

Dhives Akuru developed from Brahmi. The oldest attested inscription bears a clear resemblance to South Indian epigraphical records of the sixth-eighth centuries, written in local subtypes of the Brahmi script. The letters on later inscriptions are clearly of the cursive type, strongly reminding of the medieval scripts used in Sri Lanka and South India such as Sinhala, Grantha and Vatteluttu. There are also some elements from the Kannada-Telugu scripts.

The early form of this script was also called Divehi Akuru by Maldivians, but it was renamed Evēla Akuru "ancient letters" in a tentative manner by H. C. P. Bell to distinguish it from the more recent variant of the same script. This name became established and so the most ancient form of the Maldive script is now known as Evēla Akuru. This is the script that evolved at the time when the Maldives was an independent kingdom and it was still in use one century after the conversion to Islam.

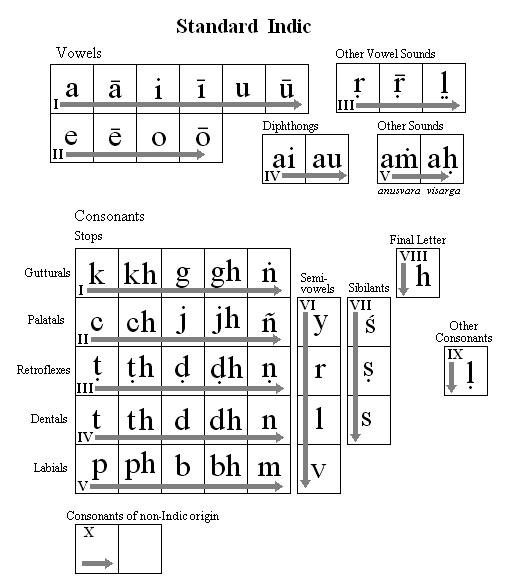
Standard Indic (IAST). This table is provided as a reference for the position of the letters on all the tables.

Evēla can be seen in the Lōmāfānu (copper plate grants) of the 12th and 13th centuries and in inscriptions on coral stone (hirigā) dating back from the Maldive Buddhist period. Two of the few copper plate documents that have been preserved are from Haddhunmathi Atoll.

The oldest inscription found in the Maldives to date is an inscription on a coral stone found at an archaeological site on Landhū Island in Southern Miladhunmadulu Atoll, where there are important Buddhist archaeological remains including a large stupa. The Landhū inscription has been paleographically dated to the 6th–8th centuries CE. The script in the inscription resembles a late form of Brahmi. Even though long before that time Maldivian Buddhist monks had been writing and reading manuscripts in their language, older documents have not yet been discovered yet.

The reason why even at that time the local script was known as "Dhivehi Akuru" by Maldivians was because another non-Maldivian script was used in the country. This was a Devanagari script related to the form used by Bengali and it had a ceremonial value. A Nagari inscription has also been found, but its contents currently unknown. Thus, the name "Dhivehi Akuru" was used historically by Maldivians to distinguish their own writing system from foreign scripts. Foreign scripts were learned and introduced at that time when Maldivian monks visited the Buddhist learning centres of Nalanda and Vikramashila.

== Later Dhivehi or Dhives Akuru ==
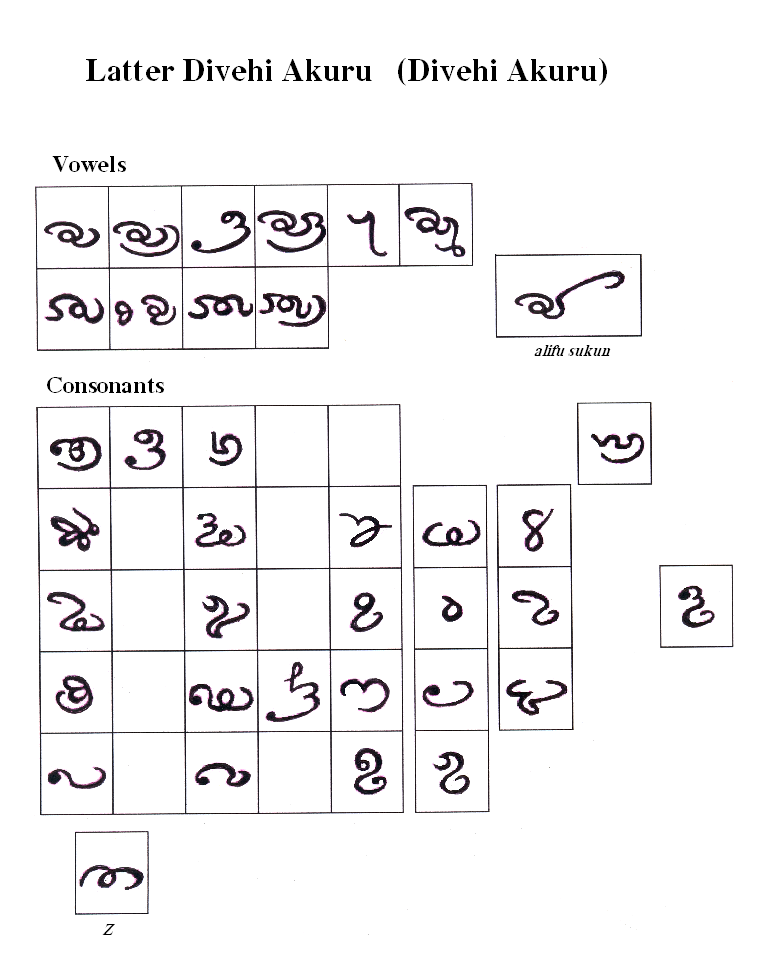
Dhives Akuru according to Bodufenvalhuge Sidi.

Among the Divehi Akuru scripts, the later form of the Dhivehi script was the script that evolved from the ancient Dhivehi script or Evēla Akuru after the conversion of the Maldives to Islam. It was still used in some atolls in the South Maldives as the main script until around 70 years ago. Since then it is rarely used, not even having a ceremonial role in scrolls of coats-of-arms or badges of government entities and associations, where Arabic is favoured.

This script can be found on gravestones, old grants in paper and wood, and in some monuments, including the stone base of the pillars supporting the main structure of the ancient Friday Mosque in Malé. British researcher H. C. P. Bell obtained an astrology book written in Divehi Akuru in Addu Atoll, in the south of Maldives, during one of his trips. This book is now kept in the National Archives of Sri Lanka in Colombo.

== The modern script ==
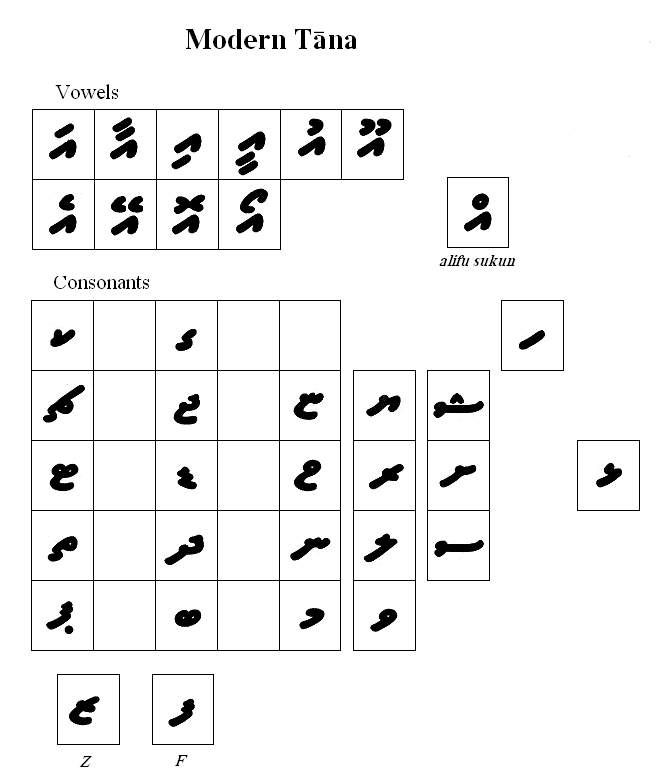
Thaana, the contemporary official Dhivehi script

Thaana is the first Dhivehi script written from right to left. It was inspired by numbers. It uses numerals as consonants and adds the diacritical (vowel) marks of the Arabic language.

The first Thaana manuscripts are written in a crude early version of this script, where the Arabic numerals have not yet been slanted 45 degrees and still looked like numbers. The oldest inscription in Thaana dates from 1599.

The main reason why the Divehi Akuru were abandoned in favour of the Thaana script was owing to the need the learned Maldivians had to include words and sentences in Arabic while writing in the Dhivehi language.

The most intriguing fact about the Thaana alphabet is its order (hā, shaviyani, nūnu, rā, bā, etc.). Its sequence does not follow the ancient order of the other Indic scripts (like Sinhala or Tamil) or the order of the Arabic alphabet. This points to a likely esoteric origin of Thaana, namely to a script that was scrambled on purpose to keep it secret from average islanders. At their origin the Thaana characters, which are based on Arabic and Dives Akuru numerals, were used in fanditha (local magic or sorcery) to write magical spells. Many of these arcane incantations included Arabic quotations from the Qur'an, which were written from right to left.

This script is currently in use as the only Dhivehi writing system. While at their origin documents written in Thaana were full of Arabic words and quotations, the tendency is now to include as little Arabic script as possible, especially since special Thaana letters (thikijehi thaana) with dots were introduced to replace Arabic letters. The Thaana script is widely used nowadays by Maldivians both in official and unofficial documents.

=== Abolishment of the letter ṇaviyani ===
The letter ṇaviyani (ޱ), representing the retroflex nasal /ɳ/, was abolished from official documents in 1950 by Mohamed Ameen, the president of Maldives.

The former position of the letter Naviyani in the Thaana alphabet was nineteenth, between letters Daviyani and Zaviyani. It is still seen in reprints of traditional old books like the Bodu Tharutheebu. It is also used by people of Addu and Fuvahmulah when writing songs or poetry in their language variants.

== The Dhivehi Akuru book ==
In 1959, during Sultan Mohammed Farid's reign, former Prime Minister (and later President) Ibrahim Nasir expressed a wish to have a book written about the former Dhivehi script which by that time was largely forgotten by Maldivians. Thus, he contacted As-Sayyid Bodufenvalhuge Sidi (1888–1970), an eminent Maldivian scholar, who swiftly obliged. Hence Dhivehi Akuru is perhaps the only book ever written in Thaana that opens from the left side.

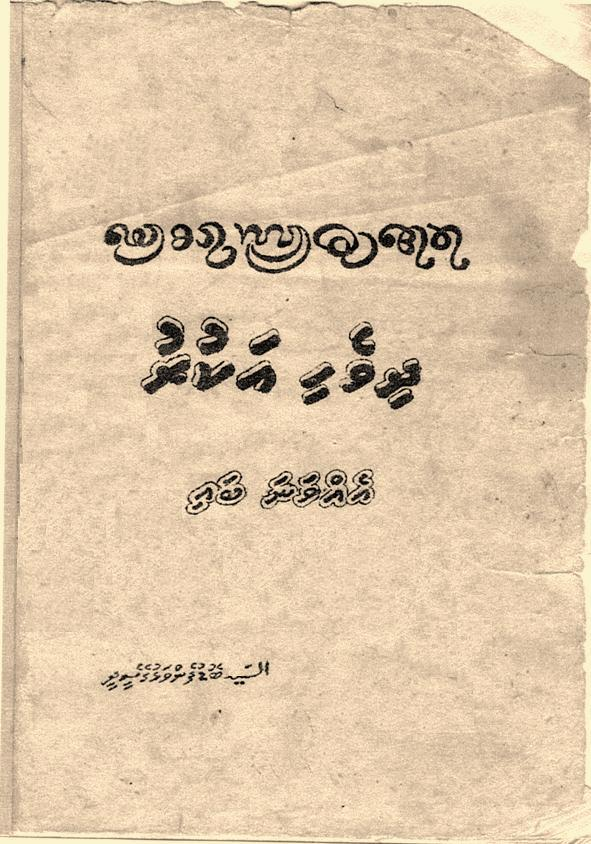
Cover of the "Dhivehi Akuru" book written by Bodufenvalhuge Sidi

== Romanisation of Maldivian ==
Towards the mid-1970s, during President Ibrahim Nasir's tenure, telex machines were introduced by the Maldivian Government in the local administration. The new telex equipment was viewed as a great progress, however the local Thaana script was deemed to be an obstacle because messages on the telex machines could only be written in the Latin script.

Following this, Dhivehi Letin, an official Latin alphabet, was approved by the Maldivian government in 1976 and implemented by the administration. Booklets were printed and dispatched to all atoll and island offices, as well as schools and merchant liners.

The Thaana script was reinstated by President Maumoon Abdul Gayoom shortly after he took power in 1978. It continued to be used as the primary romanisation system of the Maldivian Language.

== Devanagari script for Mahl ==
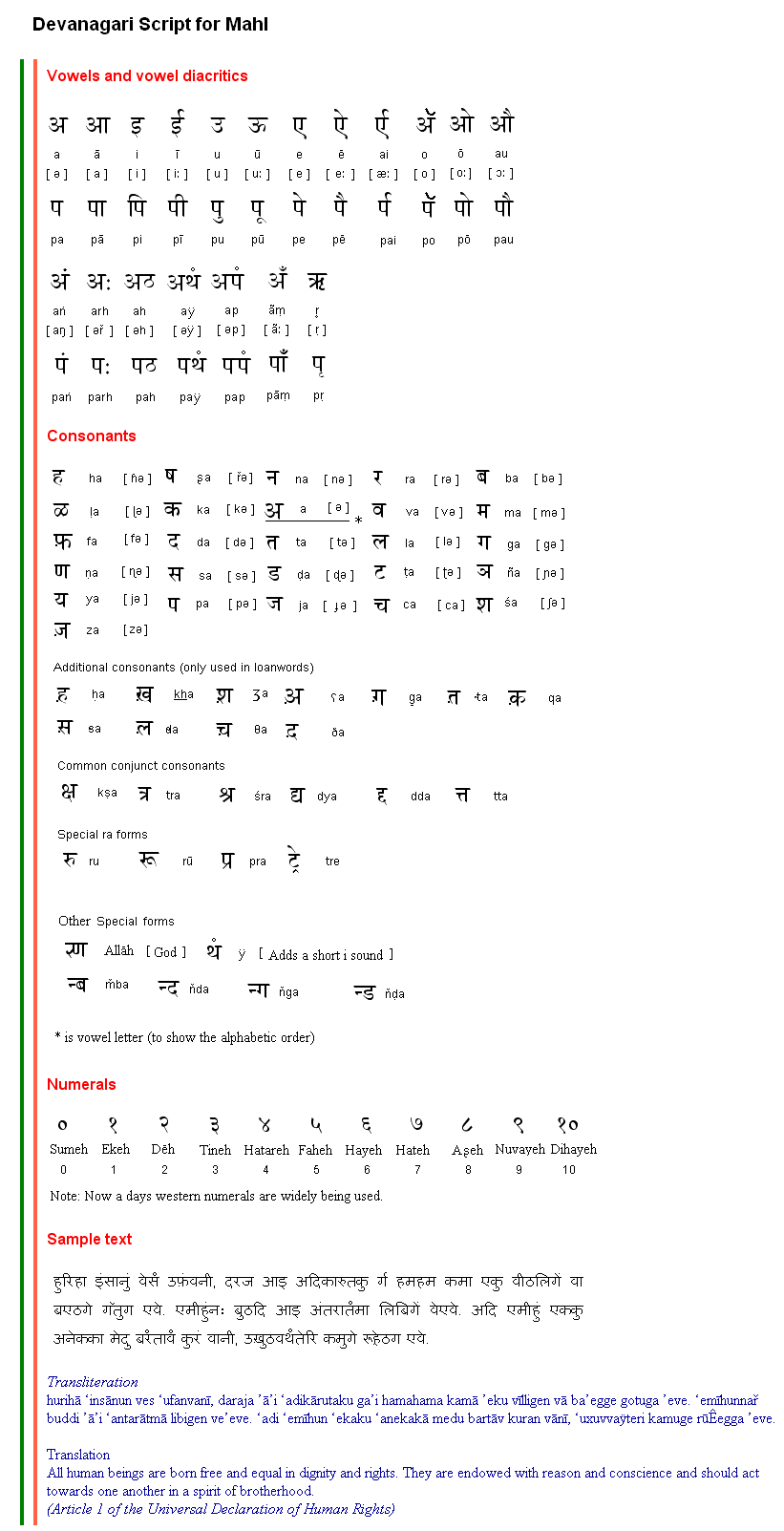
Devanagari script for Mahl

Although the Mahl dialect of the Dhivehi language spoken in the island of Minicoy in Union territory of Lakshadweep, India is also written mainly using the Thaana alphabet, in the 1950s a Devanagari script was modified to write the Maldivian dialect.
