= Boduhuraa =

Boduhuraa as a place name may refer to:

- Boduhuraa (Kaafu Atoll) (Republic of Maldives)
- Boduhuraa (Laamu Atoll) (Republic of Maldives)
- Boduhuraa (Lhaviyani Atoll) (Republic of Maldives)
- Boduhuraa (Noonu Atoll) (Republic of Maldives)
- Boduhuraa (Raa Atoll) (Republic of Maldives)
- Boduhuraa (Faafu Atoll) (Republic of Maldives)
