= Judiciary of the Maldives =

Overview of judiciary in Maldives

The Judiciary in the Maldives has been a systematic institution throughout the history of the nation. It has always been an institution which is under the full control of the Head of State and is still to some degree. However a radical change occurred during the past decades, the introduction of the English legal system into the country; a result of the Maldivian society coming in close contact with the outside world. Consequently, the present legal system of the country is a mixture of not only Shari’ah and customs, but the English legal system also.

== Pre-Islamic history ==
According to Allama Ahmed Shihabuddine of Meedhoo, the son of Addu Bodu Fandiyaaru Thakurufaanu, the first inhabitants of the Maldives, the Dheyvis, came here around 4th century B.C. and had a leader whom they called Sawamia. The Sawamia was the religious leader of these people. They thought that this Sawamia was an agent of God and hence, in their social organisation he held absolute power of life and death over the people. He was the authority on their affairs. All disputes and conflicts, whether between two government officials, or a government official and a common person, or between two common people, were decided by the Sawamia.

According to Isdhoo Loamaafaanu, a historical document of the Maldives written in 1195 A.C., there was a set of customs implemented as law in the country when Islam came in 1153 A.C. This set of customs was known as poorube roodin.

Within a century after the colonization of the Maldives by the Dheyvis, another wave of travellers came from India and started to occupy the country with the former. The merger of these two people lead to a development of a new society and finally gave rise to an authoritative monarchy. That is the time when the dictations of the King started to absolute; the main source of law in the country.

== Islamic history ==
Islam became the official religion of the state of the Maldives with the conversion of King Theemuge Mahaakalaminjaa into the imported faith in 1153 A.D. As mentioned before the earliest documentary evidence of the Maldivian history of this period is the Isdhoo Loamaafaanu. This document refers to a "padiyaaru" and an "uthu padiyaaru". It can be easily concluded that the present noun given to a judge in the Dhivehi language, "fandiyaaru" is an evolved version of ‘padiyaaru. It can also be argued that the Dhivehi noun for Supreme Judge, "uththama fandiyaaru" is a developed version of "uthu padiyaaru".

The "padiyaaru, the judge, was an esteemed and respected leader of the society. This can be understood from the references in the Isdhoo Loamaafaanu. ‘Handhaanaai Thaareekhah Takai Dhivehi Raajje’ has the following words to say, “the nobles listed as testifiers in the Isdhoo Loamaafaanu were people of high caste in the society. The powerfulness of the judges can be understood from an incident recorded in the Isdhoo Loamaafaanu. According to this report the judges issued orders for some Buddhist monks of Isdhoo to be brought to Male’ and beheaded. The orders also included a commandment to demolish a monastery in the same island. According to the report these orders were executed as directed by the judges.

The reports in the Isdhoo Loamaafaanu also indicate that the judges did not meddle with other political affairs of the state. This fact does not mean that the judiciary was an independent institution in the political organization of the Maldives. But the institution involved in the administration of justice was a completely specialized institution, with the judges concerned only about their task as judicial officials. The same document also refers to an official called ‘dhandanaayaka’ who was responsible for “implementing and executing the judgments and decisions of the judges.”

The above references show that during the first century of the Islamic era of the Maldives, there were judges who were specialized in administering justice and that there were special officials who were responsible for implementing the judgments of them. The judiciary of the Maldives was a separate institution in the political organization of the country.

As aforementioned, according to the Isdhoo Loamaafaanu, a set of customs called ‘poorube roodin’ was implemented as law in the country before the coming of Islam. From the same source and later historical records it is clear that after Islam the Islamic Shari’ah gradually became the main source of laws in the country. However, many years after Islam, the ‘poorube roodin’ still played an important part in the judicial system. Historical sources also say that the king was himself an authority. His decrees were treated as law and were implemented through the judicial system. During the first century after Islam the judiciary, therefore, underwent a radical change, with a completely alien system of law being introduced. The years which followed saw the operation of three main sources of law in the country, namely, the Islamic Shari’ah, the decrees of the King and customs.

Since Islamic Shari’ah was introduced gradually, it caused the rules of Shari’ah to be altered by local customs. The Islamic Shari’ah was never implemented in the country in its complete and pure form. One example is in the dress code of the Maldivian women. Although the Shari’ah has specific commandments on this matter, accounts of Historians like Ibn Batuta, and François Pyrard show that these commandments were not implemented in medieval times. As for the duties of the judges, they were required to be thorough with both the Shari’ah laws and also the ‘poorube roodin.’ “Therefore,...the judge in the country was a scholar of not only Islamic law. He was also well versed in the customs and traditions of the Maldivian society.”

While writing about the history of the Maldives during the period of Ninth-Twelfth centuries, H. C. P. Bell quotes from the famous Arab traveler-geologist Al Idrisi (1099–1186), “His (the King's) wife administers justice…”

Was the queen the highest authority of administering justice from the beginning of political organization? After Islam did the queen rise to that position in the political arena of the country? Did that particular queen have an extraordinary influence on the administration of the state? There is not enough evidence to make a conclusion on this point. What is known is that no mention is made of a queen being the highest authority in administering justice in the country in any other document or in folk evidence.

The great traveler Abu Abdullah Muhammad, commonly called ‘Ibn Batuta’, visited the Maldives in 1343 A.C. In his records he writes as follows: “They call the judge by the name of ‘fandiyaaru kaloa.” They go to the ‘fandiyaaru kaloa’ to settle all their disputes. He is the most highly esteemed and respected person among them. His orders were like the decrees of the King himself, or even stronger. He sits on a special carpet in the palace while hearing cases. He would own three islands, and the income generated by these islands would be his income.”

From the above quotation it can be understood how powerful the judge was in the political organisation of the country. This conclusion is further strengthened by the following statements: “When I married this lady (the daughter of Suleimaan Meynaa Wazeer), the Wazeer forced me to become the Judge. … There are no(t as) many big conflicts in this country as we have in our lands. The first evil custom which I abolished as a judge was the custom of women remaining with their husbands after they had been divorced. … I completely uprooted this custom.”

Besides this account, Ibn Batuta also tells us about certain unislamic customs that he abolished by issuing rulings. We can assume that these judicial rulings should have been implemented by the ‘dhandanaayaka’ or some other officials who were in charge of implementing such rulings.

Ibn Batuta had written reports about the procedure of trial also. “If two people are to be brought before the judge, they would be ordered to do so in writing. When this order was issued the parties should present themselves before the judge as directed. If anyone failed to do so, he would be duly punished.” Ibn Batuta further says that if a person did not want to, or could not be present before the judge, he could send someone to represent him. If the defendant was able to use a representative to speak on his behalf, it possibly means that the practice of lawyers representing their clients was there in the Maldives during those days in some form.

According to Ibn Batuta, when the King felt that a case was to be reconsidered (perhaps on appeal) then the case would be tried again in the presence of the King and three ‘bodu beykalun’, by the Uthu Fandiyaaru (perhaps the Supreme Judge) and a ‘Bodu Naaibu’ or a Qaadhi. This report makes it clear that there was a kind of an appeal system also.

The main points of note from the accounts of Ibn Batuta:

1. The judge was independent to issue verdicts of disputes as he deemed fit, and the only authority that could challenge his decision was the king.
2. The procedure involved in hearings was systematic.
3. The parties involved in a conflict might use a representative to speak before the judge on behalf of him.
4. A case might be appealed in some situations.

The judicial system of the Maldives was developing and evolving. It may be incorrect to say that the system was a highly efficient system during this time. But then, the reason was that the Maldivian society was lacking a proper education system and an efficient social structure. Also, the fact that the population was divided between a number of islands, with each island having a group of few hundred people was a significant factor. As a proverb says, necessity is the mother of invention, and there was never a necessity for a highly complex and comprehensive judicial system to evolve. Some people may argue that the political supremacy of the monarchy also prevented a judicial system to developing into a highly efficient and independent political body.

François Pyrard, another foreign writer who has given considerable accounts of the Maldivian judiciary came to the country in 1602 A.C., about four centuries after Ibn Batuta. Unlike Ibn Batuta, Pyrard shed light on the judicial operations in the atolls also. He says that “each atoll is a separate province. The person in charge of each atoll is called a ‘Bodu Naa’ibu’. These Bodu Naa’ibs are the leaders of the provinces. He is responsible for implementing the religious laws. He has an obligation to manage the education system as well as the legal affairs. And he is over the other Naa’ibs in the province. “Since the Naa’ib is the absolute dictator over his province, he is responsible for deciding both criminal and civil matters. If someone wants to file a case he has to meet the Naa’ib.”

The following paragraph may be a very comprehensive description of the hierarchy of the Maldivian judiciary during the time of Pyrard. He says; “There are no judges in the Maldives. Except for Male, the laws and religious hukm are implemented in the islands by the aforementioned 13 Naa’ibs, Katheeb (a chief who run the administrative affairs of each island) and Mudims (Imams who are managing the mosques). There is a leader who is above these officials in Male. This person would always be someone very close to the King. He is known as ‘fandiyaaraa.’ He is the royal judge. If a person is not happy with a decision made by a Naa’ib in an atoll, he has the right to appeal to the fandiyaaru in Male’. It is the same in both civil and criminal cases. The fandiyaaru would seek the consultation of the Naa’ibs when deciding the case. … a person may appeal to the King also, if he is not satisfied with the decision of the fandiyaaru. Such cases would be considered by the ‘ha beykalun’ (six nobles who are regarded as the closest advisors of the King”).

So when Pyrard came to the Maldives, the judicial system was operative throughout the country as a coordinated and unified system. Pyrard says that there were no judges in the Maldives. But obviously he is mistaken on this point. Even though the Naa’ibs in the atolls were not judges, the fandiyaaru was a judge. The difference between a judge and a fandiyaaru is only of name. His reasoning may be that the Naa’ibs who carried out the functions of administering justice was also the executive heads of the atolls.

The account clearly says that in the judicial system of the country, there was a hierarchy of which the topmost official was the fandiyaaru. Under his authority were the Naa’ibs and other officials who implemented the judgments of the judiciary.

Pyrard also speaks about the procedure involved in trying a case. “they call a complain(t) ‘sakuvaa’. The hearing would be held at the residence of the Naa’ib in the atolls, and in the residence of the fandiyaaru, if it is in Male’. And sometimes important cases might be tried in the King’s palace also. If someone wants to file a case, he should speak to the Naa’ib. Then the Naa’ib would send his dheyvaani (an official who executes the decisions of the Naa’ib) to bring the defendant. If the defendant is not present in the island, then the order would be forwarded to the Bodu Naa’ib of the atoll. If the defendant is not present in the atoll, then matter is out of the Naa’ib’s power and the fandiyaaru has to intervene. The fandiyaaru has the power to order the summoning of any person in any area of the country.”

Pyrard also has the following statements to make; “if one of the parties involved in a case is not satisfied with the fandiyaaru who decided the case, he may appeal to the King. The King would, then, appoint new judges to reconsider the case all over again.”

About the supreme authority of justice in the country, Pyrard says: “the people who know the laws in that country are the judges. Administering justice is a duty on them. However, the Supreme Judge, who is above them all, is the King himself. He is the person who orders for the implementation of judgments. The king, therefore, has the power of life and death over the people. Appeals are made to the king. If he decides that a particular case is to be reconsidered, he may order that to be done to a judge or a religious scholar or any other royal official. Generally speaking, the king has the power to make decisions in all affairs, as he wishes, without consulting anybody. So he conducts the affairs of the country as he deems fit. Sometimes he appears in the form of an inhuman despot, and that is normally in cases where a hardcore criminal from a poor family is concerned.”

In 1834 A.C. Lieutenant W. Christopher wrote about the judicial system of the Maldives. “Fandiyaaraa is the highest authority after the King. He is the most highly esteemed and respected person among the public. He has two main responsibilities; namely, administering the religious affairs and heading all the judges. The fandiyaaraa who is the religious leader of the community is the person whom the people love and revere with all their hearts. They believe that he is the best person among them both in religious and legal education. As the fandiyaaraa would always be a person who knows Arabic, it is he who takes the burden of teaching them the Qur’an and its meaning. There are many Naa’ibs and Khateebs under him.”

The scope of the duties of the fandiyaaraa had been widening since the time of Pyrard. Authors like Ibn Batuta and Pyrard also emphasized that the judges were, at least to some extent, the religious leaders. However, the writings of Christopher goes on to state clearly that the fandiyaaraa was the religious leader as well.

Then came the visit of Harry Charles Purvis Bell, in 1921. Bell said that “the fandiyaaru always had a great influence both on the affairs of the common people and on the affairs of the state. As the history of the Maldives testifies, the fandiyaaraa is always a person who was capable of exerting influence on the political, internal, and external affairs of the state. He is respected by everyone alike, from the King himself to the laymen.”

1. After Islam, judges appeared as authorities who were responsible for implementing the legal system, which was composed of the Islamic Shari’ah, customs and traditions and the decrees of the King. Later the judges became religious leaders and by the end of the 19th century they were taken not just as administrators of justice but also as religious Imams.
2. The judiciary was composed of the judges in Male’ and the Bodu Naa’ibs in the Atolls and the Naa’ibs in the islands. The Naa’ib who was the legal authority in each island was at the end of the hierarchy at which he follows the Bodu Naa’ib. The latter is the chief authority of justice for an atoll. The fandiyaaru is at the top of the hierarchy and the other two are directly under his control. However, the fandiyaaru is not the ultimate authority in the judiciary. The king always had the final say in all disputes. This had been a feature of the Maldivian Judicial system throughout the known history.
3. The King, who was the head of the executive was always the head of the judiciary; in no time in the history of the Maldives was the judiciary an independent institution of the state.
4. Although the judiciary was a specialized institution in the political arena of the Maldives, at no time in the history of the country was there a special building which housed the judicial system. Since the courts are an essential element of a judiciary, one may question on this matter. However, since the palace of the King and the private residence of the Judges and Naa’ibs were used as places where the judiciary came into operation, it may be considered that they were the courts.

== Constitutional period ==
The first constitution of the Maldives was officially declared in 1932. That constitution divided the powers of the State among four different bodies, which were the King, the Cabinet of Ministers, the Legislature, and the Peoples’ Majlis. The Judiciary was not included as an independent organ of the state. Article 80 of this constitution states that "the officials responsible for administering justice are independent as long as they do not, in the process, violate the law." And that "The King will not meddle with the judicial operations of the state. However, the administration of justice shall be done in the name of the King and, in accordance with his decrees."

Amendments were brought to the first constitution in later years, until a new constitution was finally declared in 1942. Neither any amendment to the first constitution nor the new constitution declared in 1942 made any changes to the provisions of the first constitution regarding the judicial system of the state.

Amendments were brought to the Constitution of 1942 until it was replaced with a new one in 1953. This Constitution was also in the same position as the previous ones as regards the dividing of the powers of the state. However, unlike the previous constitutions, it gave a more detailed attention to the institution of the judge and other officials under the judge. It provided that there should be a fandiyaaruge (a Court) in the Maldives and that the officials of this institution would consist the Uththama fandiyaaru (Supreme Judge) and a certain number of deputies.

The first amendment to the Constitution of 1953 was made in 1954. The latter also gave the same provision on the judicial system. It did not give the judiciary the status of a separate organ, and provided that the King was the highest authority in the administration of justice. This constitution provided that the judge was to be responsible for administering justice in the name of the King and also to uphold the banners of Islam in the country.

No changes were brought to the structure of the judicial system until a new constitution was again declared in 1968. This constitution divided the powers of the state into three organs, namely, the President, the Cabinet of Ministers, and the Peoples' Majilis. Here again the judiciary was not considered as a separate organ of the state. There was a separate chapter which included provisions regarding the judiciary. The first article in this chapter provided that the administration of justice would be in the hands of special officials appointed by the President. The responsibility of upholding the banners of Islam, imposed by the previous constitutions was lifted from the judiciary by this constitution. That may be a step towards a higher level of specialization of the judicial system. The amendments brought to the Constitution of 1968 did not bring any changes to the pattern of the judiciary.

It is the new Constitution of 1998 which established the judiciary as a separate organ of the state of the Maldives for the first time. This is obviously a major change to the structure of the judicial system of the country. This constitution provided that there shall be a High Court in the Maldives and that the High Court would consist of a Chief Judge and a number of judges appointed by the President. It also provides that there shall be courts of law in the Maldives, the number of which would be decided by the President at his discretion, and that there shall be judges in these courts appointed by the President. This Constitution also gives the President the highest authority in the administration of justice. Based on this provision the judiciary is still under the control of the Head of the State. Therefore, judiciary is not an independent organ of the state in the Maldives. Rather, it is a specialized organ of the state, which deals only with the administration of justice.

=== Court system during the constitutional period ===
According to the present structure of the Maldivian judiciary, the High Court is the highest authority in the administration of justice and this institution is directly under the control of the President. However, the lower courts are under the Ministry of Justice, a limb of the Executive organ of the state, and not under the High Court. The Ministry of Justice came into being in 1909 in the form of Mahkamah al-Shariyyaah. This institution evolved to become the Ministry of Justice in 1968. When the Mahkamah al-Shariyyah came into being six officials were there in the Mahkamah to adjudicate in legal matters.

In 1955, the Mahkamah was reformed and the administration of this institution was strengthened. In accordance with the new system, three tables were created in the Mahkamah, with a Judge and a Naa’ib for each table. During the same year, a legal commission was appointed for each ward of Male.

In 1966, the tasks of the Mahkamah were divided and a thaana latter (from ‘haa’ to ‘alif’) was given to each section of the institution. In accordance with the new arrangements, ‘haa’ was the section of the Chief Judge. During the same year, the sections were numbered from 1-7. later some changes were brought to this arrangement and finally, in 1980, the 8 divisions of the Ministry of Justice were converted into 8 courts, with a numerical number given to each of them. Until the present Constitution the court system had been like this. However, with the present Constitution, a major change occurred, with the eight courts being abolished and a completely new four courts coming into being. These courts are the Family Court, the Criminal Court, the Civil Court, and the Juvenile Court. The functions of these courts can easily be implied from the names; the Family Court is concerned with all family affaires in general; the Criminal Court decides in criminal cases, the Juvenile Court in all cases in which children are involved and the Civil Court with all civil cases except family affaires.

Separate offices for legal officials or the Naa’ibs were created in the atolls in 1962. During this time, an office of the Naa’ib was established in each island. Later, an Atoll Court was established in each atoll in 1970. In 1979 all the Atoll Courts and Naa’ib Offices were abolished and an Island Court was established in each island. Since then, no major changes have come about in the judicial structure of the atolls.

With the Constitution of 2008, the Maldivian Judiciary has entered a new phase of transformation and progress. Under the Constitution, the Maldivian Judiciary is as independent as it has ever being, and the current Constitution established, for the first time in the history of the Maldives, a Supreme Court, and declared it the highest institution of the Maldivian Judiciary.

The structure of the Judiciary is as follows:

- Supreme Court is the highest Court,
- The High Court of the Maldives.
- The third level in the hierarchy stand four superior courts in Male’:
  - the Criminal Court,
  - the Civil Court,
  - the Family Court,
  - the Juvenile Court
  - the Drug Court
- At the fourth and the last level of the hierarchy, there are the Magistrate Courts, which are the subordinate courts.

Magistrate courts are located in the administrative divisions of the atolls of the Maldives, with a Magistrate Court in each inhabited island. At the moment, there are 194 Magistrate Courts in the country.

- The Administrative arm of Maldives Judiciary is Department of Judicial Administration.

== See also ==
- History of the Maldives
- Politics of the Maldives
- Constitution of the Maldives
