= Kalhuhuraa =

Kalhuhuraa as a place name may refer to:

- Kalhuhuraa (Kaafu Atoll) (Republic of Maldives)
- Kalhuhuraa (Laamu Atoll) (Republic of Maldives)
- Kalhuhuraa (Vaavu Atoll) (Republic of Maldives)
