= Ziyaaraiffushi =

Ziyaaraiffushi may refer to the following places in the Maldives:

- Ziyaaraiffushi (Kaafu Atoll)
- Ziyaaraiffushi (Laamu Atoll)
