= Kalhaidhoo =

Abandoned island in Maldives

Kalhaidhoo ކަޅައިދޫ
- Abandoned island
- Location in Maldives
- Coordinates: 1°59′13.7″N 73°32′13.63″E
- Country: Maldives
- Administrative atoll: Laamu Atoll
- Distance to Malé: 241.98 km (150.36 mi)

Dimensions
  - Length: 0.650 km (0.404 mi)
  - Width: 0.510 km (0.317 mi)

Population
  - Total: 0
- Time zone: UTC+05:00 (MST)

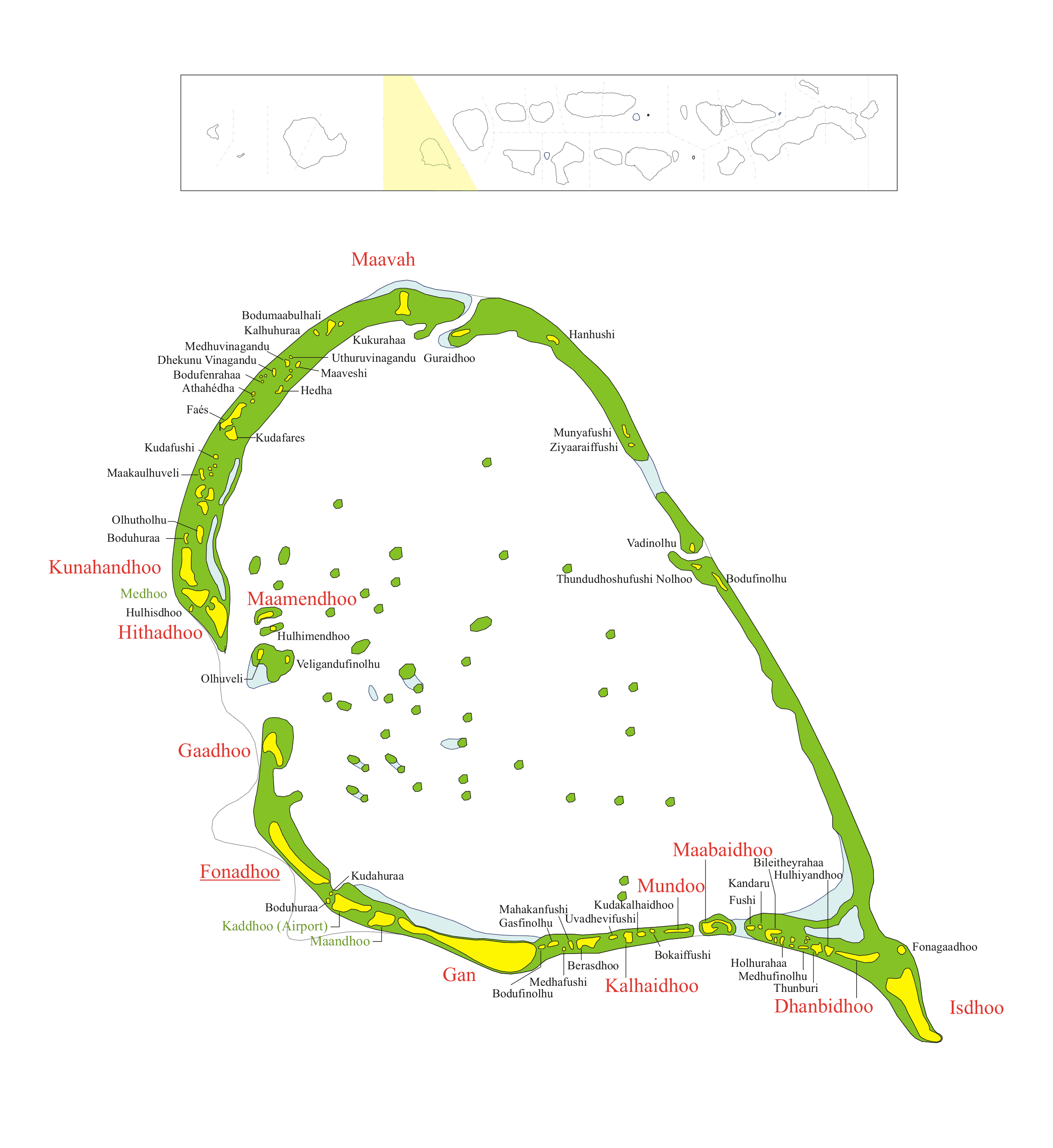
Laamu Atoll

Kalhaidhoo (Dhivehi: ކަޅައިދޫ) is an uninhabited island of Laamu Atoll. Its population has been moved to the atoll capital, Gan after the 2004 tsunami.

== Geography ==
The island is 241.98 km (150 mi; 131 nmi) south of the country's capital, Malé.

== Demography ==
Historical population
| Year | Pop. | ±% |
|---|---|---|
| 2006 | 434 | — |
Census populations Source:
