= Isdhoo =

Isdhoo may refer to the following places in the Maldives:

- Isdhoo (Gaafu Dhaalu Atoll)
- Isdhoo (Laamu Atoll)
