= Maamendhoo =

Maamendhoo as a place name may refer to:

- Maamendhoo (Gaafu Alif Atoll) (Republic of Maldives)
- Maamendhoo (Laamu Atoll) (Republic of Maldives)
- Maamendhoo (Seenu Atoll) (Republic of Maldives)
