= Maabaidhoo =

- Inhabited island
- Location in Maldives
- Coordinates: 02°01′45″N 73°31′55″E
- Country: Maldives
- Administrative atoll: Laamu Atoll
- Distance to Malé: 237.33 km (147.47 mi)

Government
  - Island Chief: Ali Firaagu moosa

Dimensions
  - Length: 1.525 km (0.948 mi)
  - Width: 0.500 km (0.311 mi)

Population (2014)
  - Total: 649 (including foreigners)
- Time zone: UTC+05:00 (MST)

Maabaidhoo (Dhivehi: މާބައިދޫ) is one of the inhabited islands of Laamu Atoll, Medhu-dekunu Province.

It has its own dialect of Dhivehi which is considerably different from northern and mid-Maldivian speech. Kadhdhoo Airport is situated on a nearby island. Maabaidhoo also has one of the 4 mangroves in Maldives.

== Geography ==
The island is 237.33 km (147 mi; 128 nmi) south of the country's capital, Malé.

== Demography ==
Historical population
Year	Pop.	±%
2006	690	—
2020	2,000	+189.9%
2006-2014: Census populations Source:
