= Mundoo (Laamu Atoll) =

- Inhabited island
- Location in Maldives
- Coordinates: 02°00′45″N 73°32′03″E
- Country: Maldives
- Administrative atoll: Laamu Atoll
- Distance to Malé: 239.17 km (148.61 mi)

Dimensions
  - Length: 1.420 km (0.882 mi)
  - Width: 0.220 km (0.137 mi)

Population (2014)
  - Total: 236 (including foreigners)
- Time zone: UTC+05:00 (MST)

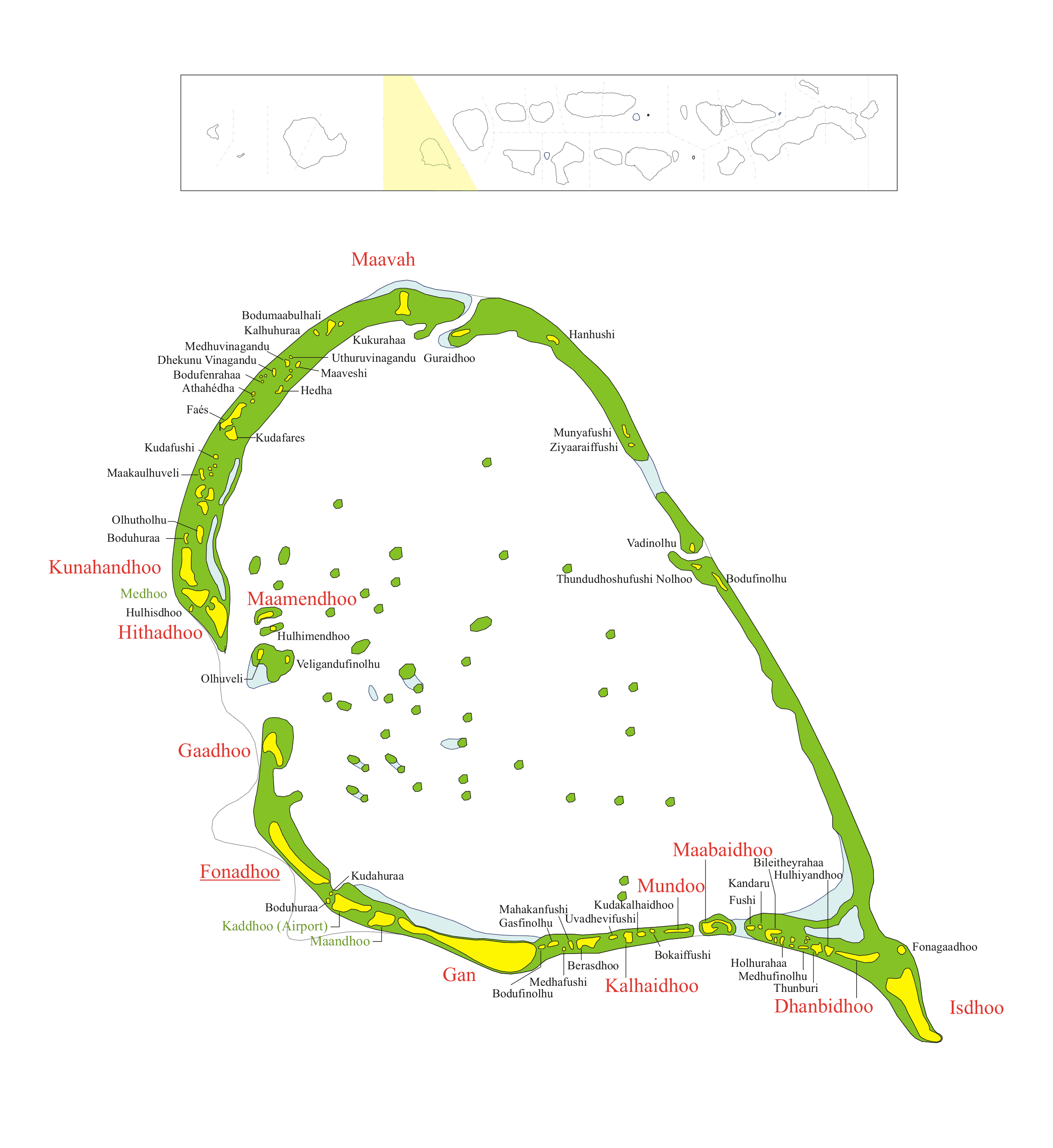
Map of the Laamu Atoll

Mundoo (Dhivehi: މުންޑޫ) is one of the inhabited islands of Haddhunmati Atoll (code letter "Laamu"). It is located in the long reef fringing the eastern side of Haddummati.

== History ==
=== Archaeology ===
This island has large ruins from the historical Maldivian Buddhist era. The stupa, then ruinous, was excavated by H. C. P. Bell in 1923.

Nothing noteworthy was found at this site. The stupa had been much vandalized and was merely a low mound of rubble and sand. Almost all carved porites stones had been removed. Few traces of railings or steps remained.

A report was published in Bell's monograph.

== Geography ==
The island is 239.17 km (149 mi; 129 nmi) south of the country's capital, Malé.

== Demography ==
Historical population
Year	Pop.	±%
2006	372	—
2014	222	−40.3%
2022	176	−20.7%
Census populations Source:
