= Bodufenvalhuge Sidi =

Maldivian writer (1888–1970)

Bodufenvalhugey Sidi
- ބޮޑުފެންވަޅުގޭ ސީދީ
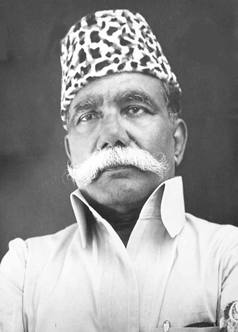
- Portrait, c. 1960
- Born: Hussain el-Hussaini; 19 May 1888
- Died: 2 June 1970 (aged 82); Malé
- Other name: Assayyidhu Bodufenvalhugey Seedhee
- Occupation: Writer
- Known for: Works
- Relatives: Aminath Faiza (niece)

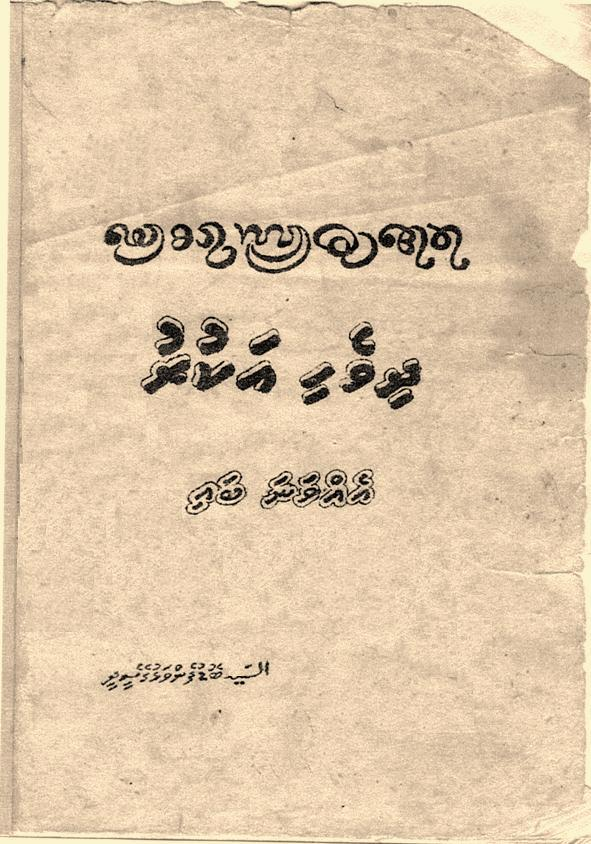
Cover of the "Divehi Akuru" book written by Bodufenvalhuge Sidi

Bodufenvalhugey Sidi (Dhivehi: ބޮޑުފެންވަޅުގޭ ސީދީ; born Hussain el-Hussaini; 19 May 1888 – 2 June 1970), or Assayyidhu Bodufenvalhugey Seedhee, was a Maldivian intellectual and writer.

== Biography ==
Bodufenvalhugey Sidi, born on 19 May 1888 as Hussain el-Hussaini, was the son of Bodufenvalhugey Dhon Manike and Mohamed Kuda Sidi. He was a poet, and also at one time chief justice. He married eight women and had five surviving children from four of these marriages. His first wife was Bodugalugey Aisha Didi, daughter of Bodugalugey Lhathutthu Didi. Among his descendants are Ahmed Mujuthaba and Mohamed Mustafa, who are both prominent in Maldivian administration and politics.

Sidi spent several years of his youth in Addu Atoll with his maternal relatives. Addu Atoll was the main centre of learning in the Maldives at that time, the turn of the 20th century. He was educated there by a well-known master and relative, Elhagey Abdullah Didi, son of Gan'duvaru Hassan Didi, also known as Dhon Beyyaa of Meedhoo. He was credited with many of the developments in Maldivian poetry in the 20th century. He was the last major poet to write in the Maldivian poetic style called raivaru, and one of the first poets to write in the Maldivan poetry style called lhen. His early poems were mainly political satire.

In 1925, an attempt was made to depose Sultan Muhammad Shamsuddheen III in favour of Prince Abdulla Imadhuddheen, son of the deposed King Siri Kula Sundhura Katthiri Bavana (Sultan Muhammad Imaadhuddheen VI). The deposed king was exiled in Egypt while Abdulla Imadhuddheen was on a visit to Malé from Egypt. The attempt was foiled in February 1925 and Abdulla Imadhuddheen was deported to Egypt. The other conspirators were banished to various atolls of the Maldives. Sidi, the most well-educated and widely respected of the conspirators, was accused of masterminding the plot. He denied the charge and claimed that he advised strongly against the timing and the modus operandi in the plot. He engaged in a hunger strike and refused to answer any questions, saying that he had done nothing wrong. After he had agreed to take his food, he insisted on homemade food. He was successful in having this wish granted, and at every meal time his brother-in-law Berugey Yoosuf Fulhu turned up with his meals and waited there while he ate. Bodufenvalhugey Sidi was implying that he did not trust the Maldivian authorities.

In such cases the authorities usually meted out summary justice. The victim would be taken outside and given a thorough flogging with a cat-o-nine-tails until they were covered in blood, then lonumirus (chilli paste) would be applied to their wounds and they would be banished to a remote island. In Sidi's case they were reluctant to do so because the British had become aware of the situation. The Maldives was then a British protectorate even though the British were bound by a treaty not to interfere in internal affairs.

Bodufenvalhuge Sidi was banished to Hulhudheli in Dhaalu Atoll. Many of his maternal relatives from Addu Atoll regularly stopped at that island for provisions and water on their way to and from Malé. The authorities became suspicious and decided to send him to Maamakunudhoo, the remotest of the northern islands.

In exile in Maamakunudhoo, he continued to pursue his literary work and wrote much of his poetry. It was there that he adopted his pen name of "Himaarul Qawm" or "Donkey of the Nation". He distributed his poetry, then banned by the government, to his associates in Malé through an ex-wife, Maavaa Kileygefaanu Gan'duvaru Goma, and his sister Bodufenvalhugey Dhon Didi.

Sidi remained on Maamakunudhoo Island for eight years until he was pardoned in a general amnesty following the forced abdication of King Shamsuddheen. Upon arrival in Malé he was appointed Chief Justice. He was also appointed to the Council of Regency that ruled in the absence of a sultan. After returning to Malé, he continued to write poetry and a few novels and other books.

He was the last known person with a working knowledge of the older Maldive script called Dhives Akuru. Sidi was one of the very few Maldivian people of modern times who understood the now-forgotten ancient Dhivehi letters in which parts of royal grants, warrants and deeds were written. He learnt this ancient Dhivehi writing system in Addu Atoll. Until early in the twentieth century, all government correspondence to and from Addu Atoll was written using these ancient Dhivehi letters.

Apart from a stint in politics as the Minister of Education, Bodufenvalhugey Sidi remained in the legal/ecclesiastical professions. His literary work gradually became less radical and more conventional with age.

Bodufenvalhugey Sidi died in Malé on 2 June 1970.

== Works ==
Best known among his novels were Dhilleegey Ibrahim Didi ge Vaahaka and Maa Makunudhoo Bodu Isa ge Vaahaka. He also published a treatise on Maldive poetry called Dhivehi Lhen Hedhumuge Masaikaiytherikamuge Ran Tharaadhu.

In 1959, during Sultan Mohammed Fareed’s reign, former Prime Minister (and later President) Ibrahim Nasir expressed a wish to have a book written about the former Maldivian script, which by that time was largely ignored by Maldivians. Thus, he contacted Sidi, who swiftly obliged and wrote Dhivehi Akuru. By means of this small book Sidi wanted to clearly show that in ancient times Maldivians were writing from left to right in their own script. Hence, Dhivehi Akuru is perhaps the only book ever written in Thaana that opens from the left side. The last chapter of this book shows a text where the Divehi Akuru are accompanied with Arabic script.
