= Aminath Faiza =

Maldivian poet and author

- އާމިނަތު ފާއިޒާ
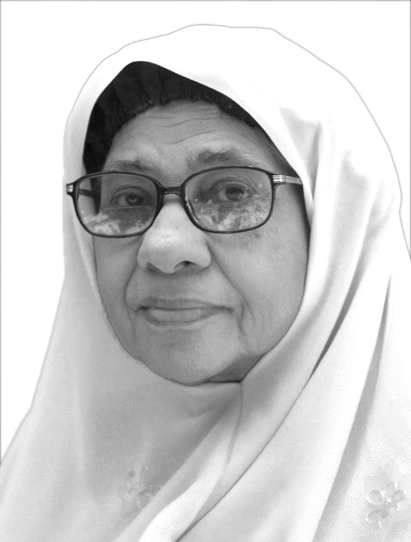
- Faiza in 2011
- Born: 29 September 1924; Galolhu, Malé, Maldive Islands
- Died: 25 February 2011 (aged 86); Malé, Maldives
- Burial place: Aa Sahara Cemetery
- Other name: Daisymaa
- Known for: poet and author
- Relatives: Bodufenvalhuge Sidi (uncle)
- Awards: Full list

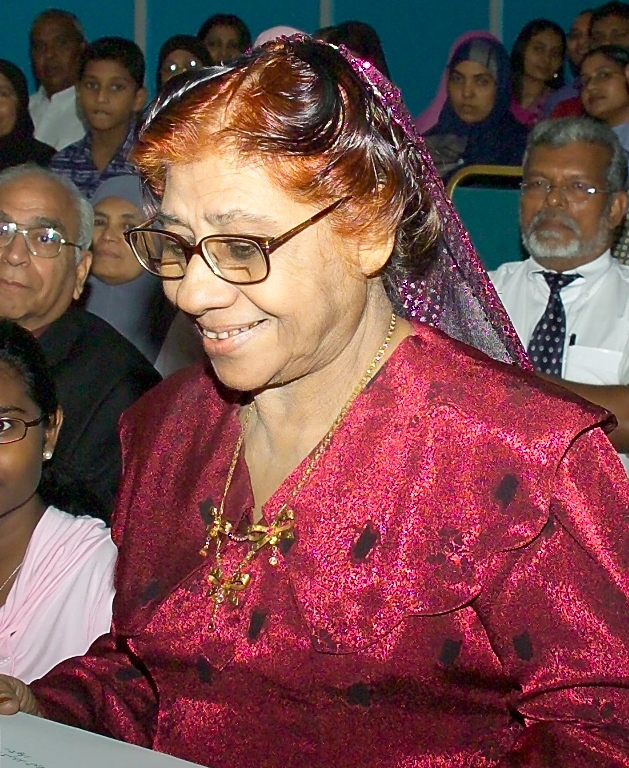
Faiza in 2005

Aminath Faiza (more popularly known as Daisymaa; 29 September 1924 – 25 February 2011) was a Maldivian Dhivehi language poet and author.

== Biography ==
Aminath Faiza began to write poetry at the age of 16. She was inspired by the late Bodufenvalhuge Seedhi, a famous poet and Faiza's maternal uncle. "Thiththibe" as Faiza called him, made her recite his poems when they were completed. During the 1950s, Faiza started showcasing her work, during which time, late Mohamed Amin Didi, the first President of the Maldives, created the "Lhen Veringe Gulzaar" (Garden of Dhivehi Poets). Aminath Faiza was the "Daisy Maa"; the Daisy flower of Maldivian poetry. Since then, she has published her poems and other works in magazines and newspapers, and has had compilations published in books throughout her career. She wrote poetry on many different topics including romance, social issues, religion, national unity, and national occasions.

Faiza served on the advisory body of the Rayyithunge Muthagaddim Party, the first political party founded in the Maldives by late president Mohamed Amin Didi. She worked as the deputy headmistress of the former Madrasat–ul Saniyya School, now called Aminiya School. Faiza also worked for Maldives Center for Historical and Linguistic Research, during which she helped to compile the Maldivian Dictionary.

She penned her last poem on the Golden Jubilee of Iskandhar School on 5 February 2011.

== Death ==
On 25 February, 2011, after suffering a stroke, she died at the age of 86 while being treated at Indira Gandhi Memorial Hospital in Malé, Republic of Maldives. A funeral prayer was held at Masjid Al Sultan Mohamed Thankurufaanu Al Auzam following Friday prayers. She was buried at the Aa Sahara cemetery in Male in a ceremony attended by political and cultural dignitaries. She had 3 children Ahmed Abbas, Aminath Abbas and Mohamed Hilmy.

== Awards ==
Faiza received 2 awards:

- National Award of Recognition (1980)
- National Award of Honour (1996)
