= Dhives Akuru =

Script for Maldivian language, used from 12th to 20th century

Dhives akuru 𑤞𑤱𑤩𑤵𑤭𑤱 𑤀𑤌𑤳𑤧𑤳
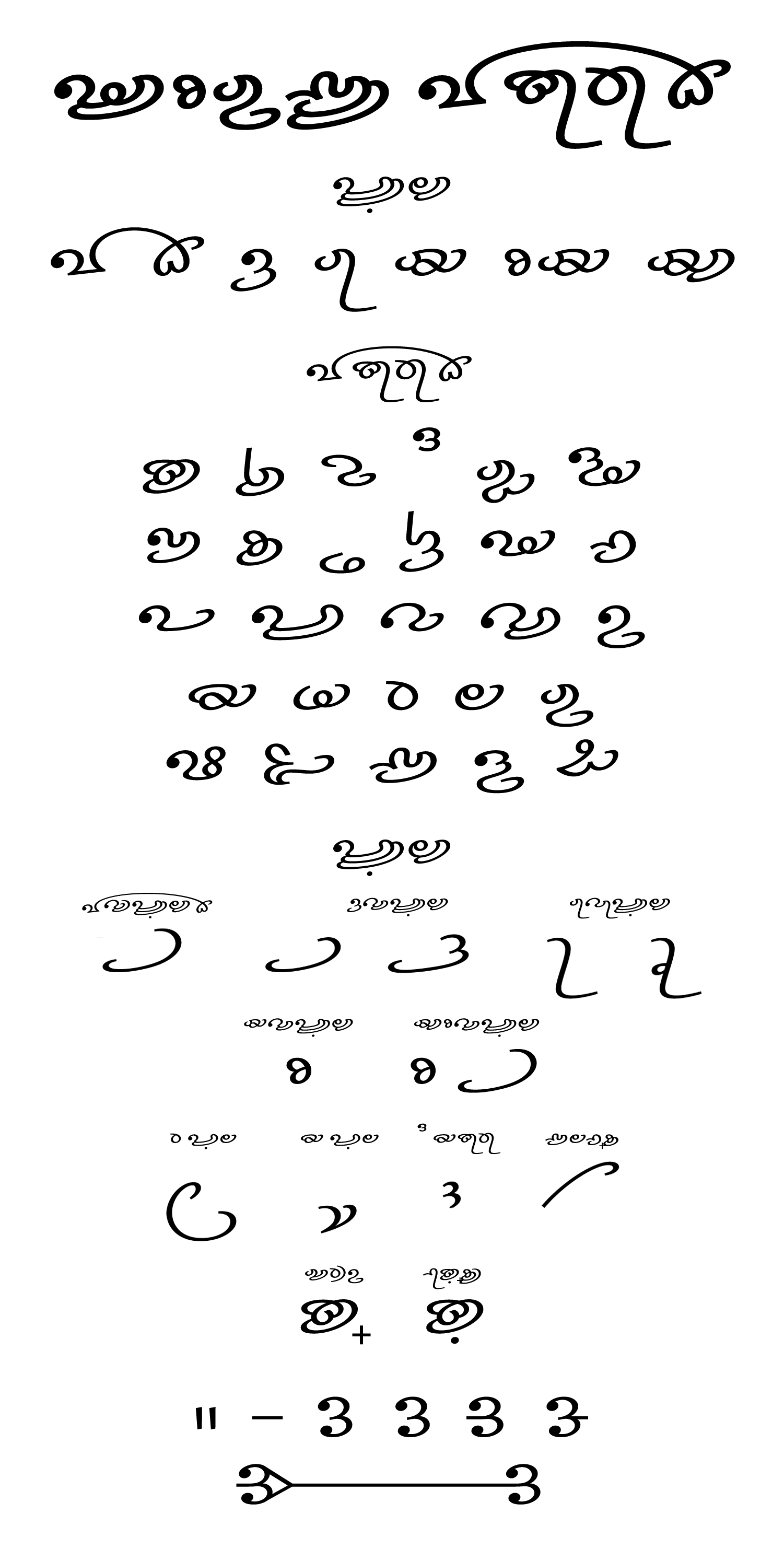
- Dives Akkuru Chart of the calligraphic form used in the 16^{th} - 18^{th} c.e.
- Script type: Abugida
- Period: 9th-10th centuries CE (earliest attestation) to 1927
- Direction: Left-to-right
- Languages: Maldivian

Related scripts
- Parent systems: Egyptian: Proto-Sinaitic; Phoenician; Aramaic; Brahmi; Tamil Brahmi; Dhives akuru
- Sister systems: Grantha; Pallava; Vatteluttu

ISO 15924
- ISO 15924: Diak (342), Dives Akuru

Unicode
- Unicode alias: Dives Akuru
- Unicode range: U+11900–U+1195F Dives Akuru

Dhives Akuru, later called Dhivehi Akuru (meaning Maldivian letters) is a script formerly used for the Maldivian language. The name can be alternatively spelled Dives Akuru or Divehi Akuru using the ISO 15919 Romanization scheme, as the "d" is unaspirated.

== History ==
Dhives Akuru developed from Brahmi. The oldest attested inscription bears a clear resemblance to South Indian epigraphical records of the sixth-eighth centuries, written in local subtypes of the Brahmi script. The letters on later inscriptions are clearly of the cursive type, strongly reminding of the medieval scripts used in Sri Lanka and South India such as Sinhala, Grantha and Vatteluttu. There are also some elements from the Kannada-Telugu scripts visible. The form of this script attested in loamaafaanu (copper plates) of the 12th and 13th centuries and in inscriptions on coral stone dating back to the Buddhist period (~200 BC to 12th century AD) was called by H.C.P Bell Evēla Akuru (meaning "script of yore")^{:82-83; footnote 5} to distinguish it from the more recent form of the same script. The most recent form (starting from around the 14th century) was more calligraphic and the letter forms changed a little. Like other Brahmic scripts, Dhives Akuru descended ultimately from the Brahmi script and thus was written from left to right.

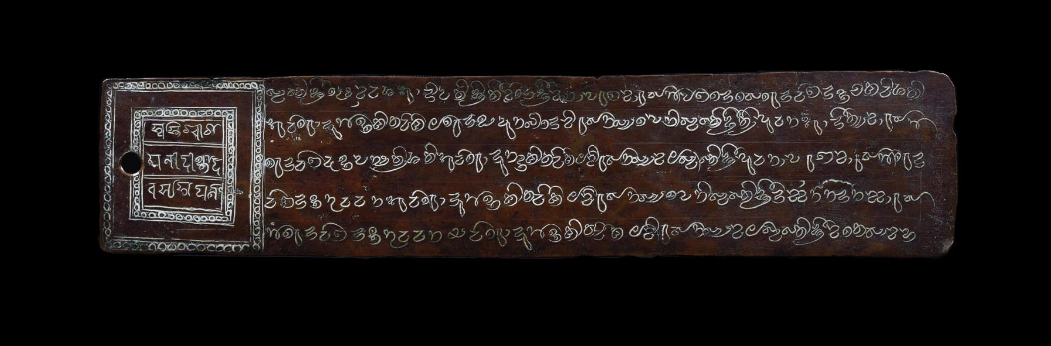
The first plate of Dhanbidhoo Loamaafaanu copper plate from 12th century Maldives.

Dhives Akuru was still used in some southern atolls along with Thaana until the end of the 19th century. The last known official document from the southern atolls (in Dhives Akuru and Thaana) was written by Haajee Muhammad Kaleygefaanu in 1927. Since then its use has been limited to scholars and hobbyists. It can still be found on gravestones and some monuments, including the stone base of the pillars supporting the main structure of the ancient Friday mosque in Malé. Bell obtained an astrology book written in Dhives Akuru in Addu Atoll, in the south of the Maldives, during one of his trips. This book is now kept in the National Archives of Sri Lanka in Colombo.

Bodufenvalhuge Sidi, an eminent Maldivian scholar, wrote a book called Divehi Akuru in 1959, prompted by then Prime Minister Ibrahim Nasir.

== Letters ==
The script name in modern typeface

=== Consonants ===
| | Unvoiced | | Voiced | | Nasal | Approximant | Sibilant | Fricative | Other |
| | Inaspirate | Aspirate | Inaspirate | Aspirate | Nasal | Approximant | Sibilant | Fricative | Other |
| velar | 𑤌 ka | 𑤍 kha (Note: Letters representing aspirated sounds, mainly used in Sanskrit transcription) | 𑤎 ga | 𑤏 gha | 𑤐 ṅa | | | 𑤭 ha | |
| palatal | 𑤑 ca | 𑤒 cha | 𑤓 ja | | 𑤕 ña | 𑤥 ya | 𑤪 śa | | 𑤦 yya |
| retroflex | 𑤖 ṭa | 𑤙 ḍha | 𑤘 ḍa | | 𑤚 ṇa | 𑤮 ḷa | 𑤫 ṣa | | 𑤧 ra |
| dental | 𑤛 ta | 𑤜 tha | 𑤝 da | 𑤞 dha | 𑤟 na | 𑤨 la | 𑤬 sa | | |
| labial | 𑤠 pa | 𑤡 pha | 𑤢 ba | 𑤣 bha | 𑤤 ma | 𑤩 va | | | |
| other | | | | | | | 𑤯 za | | |

A few consonants can be marked as nasalised by prefixing the diacritic ⟨𑤿⟩.

=== Nasalised consonants ===
| 𑤿𑤎 n̆ga | 𑤿𑤘 n̆ḍa | 𑤿𑤝 n̆da | 𑤿𑤢 m̆ba |

=== Additional consonants ===
Some additional consonants are transcribed by adding a nuqta ⟨𑥃⟩ to certain letters.

𑤠𑥃𑥃
fa

=== Vowels ===
Vowels and part-vowels, their diacritics and examples with ⟨𑤌⟩, ka.
| 𑤀 a | 𑤁 ā | 𑤂 i | 𑤃 ī | 𑤄 u | 𑤅 ū | 𑤆 e | ◌ ai | 𑤉 o | ◌ (Note: The halanta (sukūn) is a diacritic that suppresses a letter's inherent vowel, leaving an isolated consonant. It can also be used for the diacritic u.) | ◌ (Note: The anusvara and candrabindu (used in Evēla Akuru) have no independent forms. They indicate that a vowel is nasalised.) | ◌ |
| ◌ (Note: The vowel a has no corresponding diacritic since every consonant carries an inherent a.) | ◌𑤰 | ◌𑤱 | ◌𑤲 | ◌𑤳 | ◌𑤴 | ◌𑤵 | ◌𑤷 | ◌𑤸 | ◌𑤽 | ◌𑤻 | ◌𑤼 |
| 𑤌 ka | 𑤌𑤰 kā | 𑤌𑤱 ki | 𑤌𑤲 kī | 𑤌𑤳 ku | 𑤌𑤴 kū | 𑤌𑤵 ke | 𑤌𑤷 kai | 𑤌𑤸 ko | 𑤌𑤽 k | 𑤌𑤻 | 𑤌𑤼 |

== Numerals ==
Numerals
| 𑥐 0 | 𑥑 1 | 𑥒 2 | 𑥓 3 | 𑥔 4 | 𑥕 5 | 𑥖 6 | 𑥗 7 | 𑥘 8 | 𑥙 9 |

The numeral signs in Dhives Akuru are the basis of nine of the letters used in Thaana, the modern Maldivian alphabet.

== Unicode ==
The Dhives Akuru script was added to Unicode version 13.0 in March 2020, with 72 characters located in the Dives Akuru block (U+11900–U+1195F):

Dives Akuru^{[1]}^{[2]} Official Unicode Consortium code chart (PDF)
| | 0 | 1 | 2 | 3 | 4 | 5 | 6 | 7 | 8 | 9 | A | B | C | D | E | F |
| U+1190x | 𑤀 | 𑤁 | 𑤂 | 𑤃 | 𑤄 | 𑤅 | 𑤆 | | | 𑤉 | | | 𑤌 | 𑤍 | 𑤎 | 𑤏 |
| U+1191x | 𑤐 | 𑤑 | 𑤒 | 𑤓 | | 𑤕 | 𑤖 | | 𑤘 | 𑤙 | 𑤚 | 𑤛 | 𑤜 | 𑤝 | 𑤞 | 𑤟 |
| U+1192x | 𑤠 | 𑤡 | 𑤢 | 𑤣 | 𑤤 | 𑤥 | 𑤦 | 𑤧 | 𑤨 | 𑤩 | 𑤪 | 𑤫 | 𑤬 | 𑤭 | 𑤮 | 𑤯 |
| U+1193x | 𑤰 | 𑤱 | 𑤲 | 𑤳 | 𑤴 | 𑤵 | | 𑤷 | 𑤸 | | | 𑤻 | 𑤼 | 𑤽 | 𑤾 | 𑤿 |
| U+1194x | 𑥀 | 𑥁 | 𑥂 | 𑥃 | 𑥄 | 𑥅 | 𑥆 | | | | | | | | | |
| U+1195x | 𑥐 | 𑥑 | 𑥒 | 𑥓 | 𑥔 | 𑥕 | 𑥖 | 𑥗 | 𑥘 | 𑥙 | | | | | | |
Notes 1.As of Unicode version 18.0 2.Grey areas indicate non-assigned code points

== See also ==
- Maldivian language
- Sinhala script
- Thaana script
- History of the Maldives
