= Kadhdhoo =

- Inhabited island
- Location in Maldives
- Coordinates: 1°51′35.17″N 73°31′16.25″E
- Country: Maldives
- Geographic atoll: Haddhunmathi Atoll
- Administrative atoll: Laamu Atoll
- Distance to Malé: 232 km (144 mi)

Area
  - Total: 1.07 km^{2} (0.41 sq mi)

Dimensions
  - Length: 2 km (1.2 mi)
  - Width: 1 km (0.62 mi)

Population (2014)
  - Total: 30
  - Density: 28/km^{2} (73/sq mi)
- Time zone: UTC+05:00 (MST)

Kadhdhoo or Kaddhoo, Kahdhoo (according to the Admiralty Charts) (Dhivehi: ކައްދޫ އެއަރޕޯޓް) is one of the inhabited islands of Haddummati Atoll, administrative code Laamu.

== Geography and climate ==
The island is 256.05 km (159 mi; 138 nmi) south of the country's capital, Malé. It is located south of Maandhoo and 500 m (550 yd) northeast of Fonadhoo.

Kadhdhoo has a tropical rainforest climate (Köppen: Af) with heavy rainfall year-round.

Climate data for Kadhdhoo Airport, (elevation 1.2 m (3.9 ft), 1991−2020 normals)
Month	Jan	Feb	Mar	Apr	May	Jun	Jul	Aug	Sep	Oct	Nov	Dec	Year
Mean daily maximum °C (°F)	30.7 (87.3)	31.2 (88.2)	32.0 (89.6)	32.4 (90.3)	31.8 (89.2)	31.7 (89.1)	31.5 (88.7)	31.3 (88.3)	31.2 (88.2)	31.1 (88.0)	31.0 (87.8)	30.7 (87.3)	31.4 (88.5)
Daily mean °C (°F)	28.2 (82.8)	28.6 (83.5)	29.3 (84.7)	29.5 (85.1)	29.2 (84.6)	29.1 (84.4)	28.8 (83.8)	28.7 (83.7)	28.5 (83.3)	28.4 (83.1)	28.3 (82.9)	28.1 (82.6)	28.7 (83.7)
Mean daily minimum °C (°F)	25.1 (77.2)	25.2 (77.4)	25.6 (78.1)	26.0 (78.8)	25.7 (78.3)	25.8 (78.4)	25.3 (77.5)	25.1 (77.2)	25.1 (77.2)	25.0 (77.0)	24.8 (76.6)	24.8 (76.6)	25.3 (77.5)
Average precipitation mm (inches)	131.7 (5.19)	81.3 (3.20)	84.6 (3.33)	163.0 (6.42)	279.1 (10.99)	112.1 (4.41)	162.0 (6.38)	194.8 (7.67)	238.8 (9.40)	270.5 (10.65)	263.7 (10.38)	261.4 (10.29)	2,243 (88.31)
Average precipitation days (≥ 0.1 mm)	7.2	4.9	6.5	10.7	15.9	10.3	11.8	12.7	14.6	16.8	15.7	13.2	140.3
Source: NOAA

== Economy ==
The island is dominated by its airport. Kadhdhoo has several other facilities, including a mosque, hotel, several restaurants, harbour, storage facilities and a gas station (whose owner has the house with the sole family that actually lives on this island).

== Transport ==
=== Air ===
This island holds Kadhdhoo Airport, which is the largest airport of the Middle-Maldives District.

=== Road ===
The island is connected by causeway to Fonadhoo.
