= Kunahandhoo =

- Inhabited island
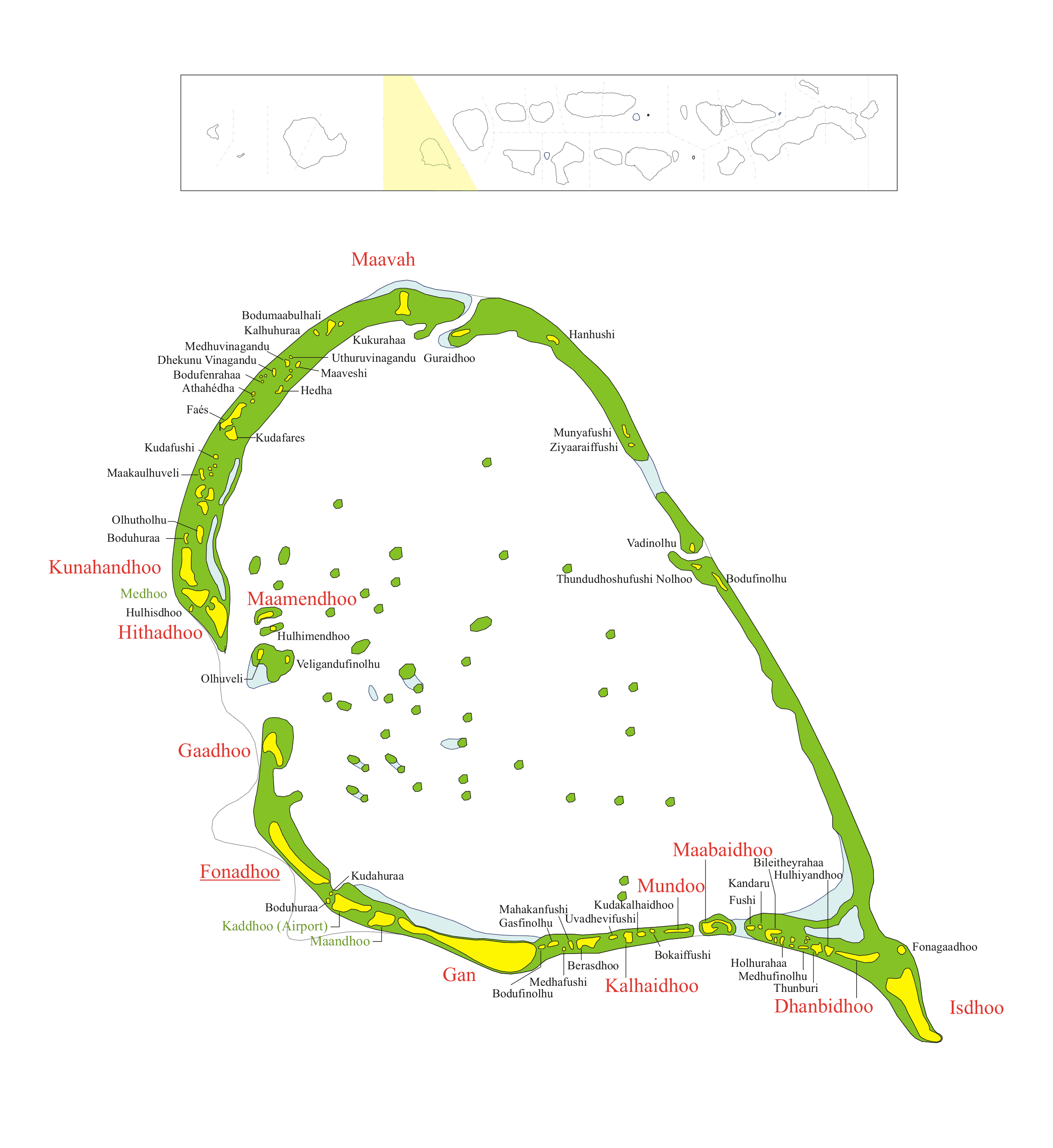
- Map of Laamu Atoll with Kunahandhoo located above the centre of the left-hand side of the map

- Location in Maldives
- Coordinates: 01°46′52″N 73°22′00″E
- Country: Maldives
- Administrative atoll: Laamu Atoll
- Distance to Malé: 265.21 km (164.79 mi)

Dimensions
  - Length: 1.900 km (1.181 mi)
  - Width: 0.750 km (0.466 mi)

Population (2014)
  - Total: 650 (including foreigners)
- Time zone: UTC+05:00 (MST)

Kunahandhoo (Dhivehi: ކުނަހަންދޫ) is one of the inhabited islands of Laamu Atoll.

== Geography ==
The island is 265.21 km (165 mi; 143 nmi) south of the country's capital, Malé.

== Demography ==
Historical population
Year	Pop.	±%
2006	602	—
2014	628	+4.3%
2006-2014: Census populations Source:
