= Maavah =

Maavah މާވަށް
- Inhabited island
- Location in Maldives
- Coordinates: 01°53′08″N 73°14′38″E
- Country: Maldives
- Administrative atoll: Laamu Atoll
- Distance to Malé: 254.9 km (158.4 mi)

Dimensions
  - Length: 1.21 km (0.75 mi)
  - Width: 1.000 km (0.621 mi)

Population (2022) (including foreigners)
  - Total: 1,379
- Time zone: UTC+05:00 (MST)

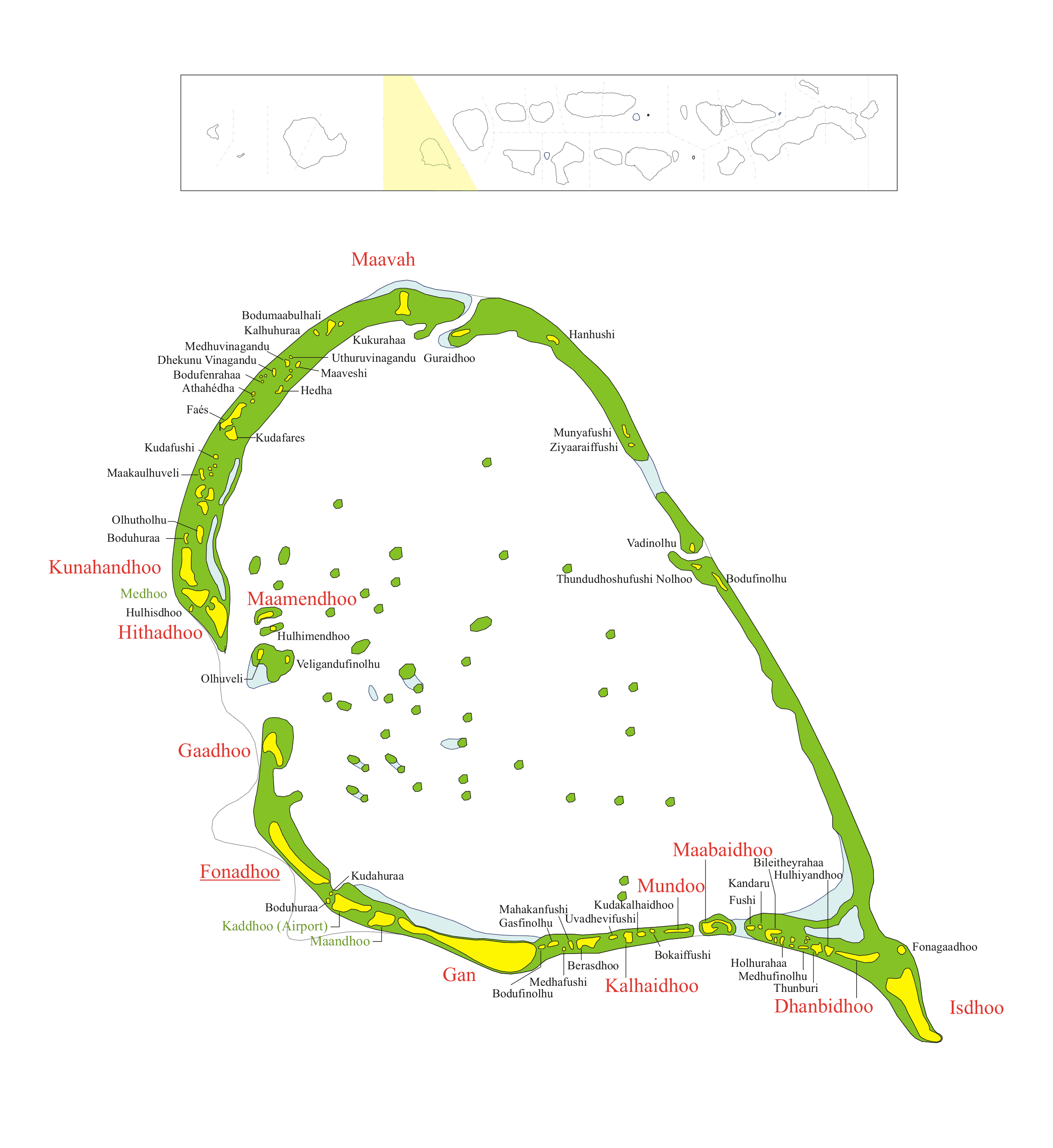
Map of Laamu Atoll. Maavah is labelled at the top

Maavah (Dhivehi: މާވަށް) is one of the inhabited islands of Laamu Atoll.

== Geography ==
The island is 254.9 km (158 mi; 138 nmi) south of the country's capital, Malé.

== Demography ==
Historical population
Year	Pop.	±%
2006	1,373	—
2014	1,400	+2.0%
2022	1,379	−1.5%
2006-2022: Census populations Source:
