= Raivaru =

Raivaru is a type of Maldivian traditional singing, where letters are swapped to be sung in a certain melody without accompaniment.

With the development of the Maldivian culture and the introduction of the ground rules of literature (Adhabiyyaathu) and the improvement of the Dhivehi language, Raivaru transformed from a simple to a very developed art and part of the Maldivian syllabus for learning of Dhivehi as a first language.

With the newly made rules of Raivaru some basic rules were made on how the letters in a Raivaru were arranged. Thus came into existence two main types of raivaru, first raivaru with six lines of words, the lines in a raivaru are called as "bas" so a raivaru with six lines or six sentences was called a "Ha bahuge raivaru" and the raivaru with three lines or three sentences was called as "Thin bahuge raivaru".

These were merely the ground rules, Raivaru is an art so fine that in a perfectly synchronised raivaru, a lot of features and conditions have to be met.

== Parts of a Raivaru ==
There are an array of names given to different parts of a Raivaru. They are as follows: "Banduvah akuru": The name given to the second letter of the first word in every bas (verse). "Fili Koalhi": The name given to the first two "fili" (accent mark) of a bas. "Gaey bas": The name assigned to the second last bas. "Fahu bas": The name given to the last bas.
