= Kadhdhoo Airport =

Kadhdhoo Airport ކައްދޫ އެއަރޕޯޓް
- IATA: KDO; ICAO: VRMK

Summary
- Airport type: Public
- Operator: Maldives Airports Co.
- Serves: Haddhunmathi Atoll, Maldives
- Location: Kadhdhoo, Laamu Atoll
- Elevation AMSL: 4 ft (1.2 m)
- Coordinates: 01°51′33″N 073°31′19″E
- Website: http://kacl.aero

Map
- Location in Maldives

Runways
Direction	Length		Surface
Direction	m	ft	Surface
03/21	1,220	4,003	Bituminous
- Sources: Airport website, DAFIF

Kadhdhoo Airport (Dhivehi: ކައްދޫ އެއަރޕޯޓް) (IATA: KDO, ICAO: VRMK) is a domestic airport located on the island of Kadhdhoo in Laamu Atoll, Maldives. The airport is 3.7 km (2.0 NM) northeast of Fonadhoo.

== History ==
Excavation for the runway began on 11 January 1982, and the final layer of the runway was completed on 6 April 1986.

The project was initiated under the Government's budget alone, additional financial assistance was received from outside, notably from the United Nations Development Program (UNDP), the International Civil Aviation Organization (ICAO) and the Organization of Petroleum Exporting Countries’ Fund (OPEC Fund). The length of the runway at Kadhdhoo airport was 762 meters long and 30 m wide.

When the Maldivian president Maumoon Abdul Gayyoom assumed office in 1978, some of the most pressing problems faced by the country were the immense difficulty involved in traveling between Malé and the outlying islands and the adverse effects in the Maldivian fishing industry due to illegal entry of foreign fishing vessels into the Maldivian territorial waters.

Kadhdhoo is situated halfway between the airport of Malé and Gan.

== Facilities ==
The airport resides at an elevation of 4 feet (1.2 m) above mean sea level. It has one runway designated 03/21 with a bituminous surface measuring 1,220 by 30 metres (4,003 ft × 98 ft). Airport apron is 105 m x 22 m. Short take-off and landing aircraft whose maximum weight does not exceed 5700 kg can be accommodated.

== Airlines and destinations ==
Airlines	Destinations
Flyme	Maamigili, Malé
Maldivian	Gan, Kaadedhdhoo, Kooddoo, Malé
