= Isdhoo (Laamu Atoll) =

Isdhoo އިސްދޫ
- Inhabited island
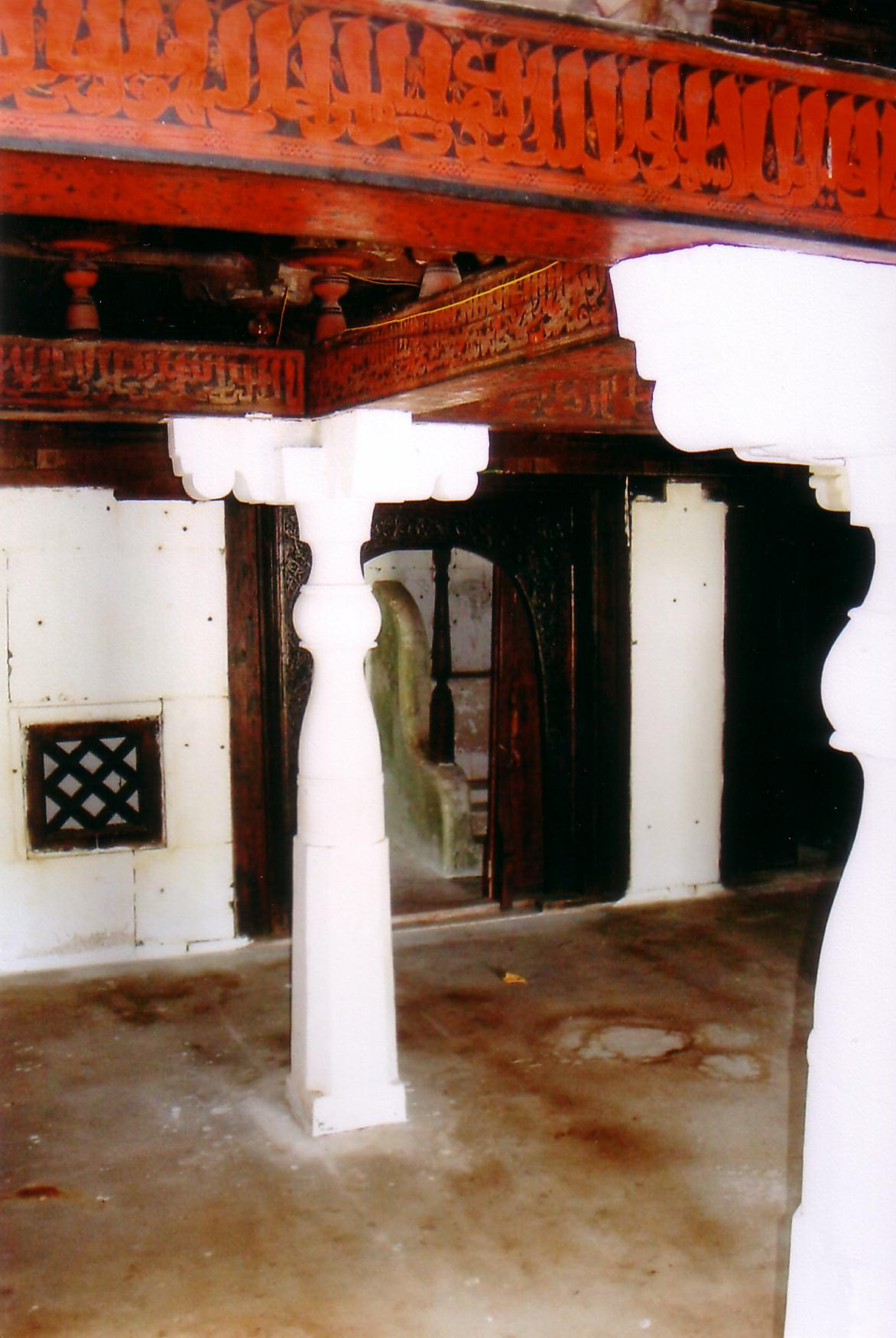
- Historic mosque on the island of Isdhoo, made from coral stones and wood

- Location in Maldives
- Coordinates: 02°07′10″N 73°34′10″E
- Country: Maldives
- Administrative atoll: Laamu Atoll
- Distance to Malé: 227.43 km (141.32 mi)

Dimensions
  - Length: 4.370 km (2.715 mi)
  - Width: 1.525 km (0.948 mi)

Population (2022)
  - Total: 929 (including foreigners)
- Time zone: UTC+05:00 (MST)

Isdhoo (Dhivehi: އިސްދޫ) is one of the inhabited islands of Haddhunmathi Atoll, administrative code Laamu part of Maldives in the Indian Ocean.

== History ==
This island has important ruins from the historical Maldivian Buddhist era. These ruins include one of the largest stupas so far found in the Maldives.

=== Isdhoo Loamaafaanu ===
Loamaafaanu are ancient royal edicts written on copper plates. Loamaafaanu edicts were etched on long copper plates held together by a ring of the same metal. The loamaafaanu were written in the curly Eveylaa form of the Divehi akuru or old Maldive alphabet and they are very important documents in the History of the Maldives. The oldest loamaafaanu that have hitherto been found and preserved are from Malé, the royal capital, and from the islands of Isdū and Dambidū in Haddhunmathi Atoll, where there were large Buddhist monasteries. These copperplates were issued at the end of the twelfth century AD. These make it clear that the general conversion from Buddhism to Islam was ordered by the king. It is also concluded that the monasteries in Haddummati Atoll (Satu Duvu) were of great importance in the ancient Buddhist Kingdom of the Maldives.

According to the loamaafaanu, monks from monasteries of the southern atoll of Haddhunmathi were brought to Malé and beheaded.

== Geography ==
The island is 227.43 km (141 mi; 123 nmi) south of the country's capital, Malé.

== Demography ==
Historical population
Year	Pop.	±%
2006	1,559	—
2014	909	−41.7%
2022	929	+2.2%
2006-2014: Census populations Source:

== See also ==
- History of the Maldives
