= Maamendhoo (Laamu Atoll) =

- Inhabited island
- Location in Maldives
- Coordinates: 01°49′10″N 73°23′20″E
- Country: Maldives
- Administrative atoll: Laamu Atoll
- Distance to Malé: 260.84 km (162.08 mi)

Dimensions
  - Length: 1.000 km (0.621 mi)
  - Width: 0.330 km (0.205 mi)

Population (2014)
  - Total: 896 (including foreigners)
- Time zone: UTC+05:00 (MST)

Maamendhoo (Dhivehi: މާމެންދޫ) is one of the inhabited islands of Laamu Atoll.

== Geography ==
The island is 260.84 km (162 mi; 141 nmi) south of the country's capital, Malé.

== Demography ==
Historical population
Year	Pop.	±%
2006	845	—
2014	826	−2.2%
2006-2014: Census populations Source:
