= Fonadhoo =

Capital island of Laamu Atoll, Maldives

- capital island
- Location in Maldives
- Coordinates: 01°50′00″N 73°30′00″E
- Country: Maldives
- Administrative atoll: Laamu Atoll
- Distance to Malé: 258.97 km (160.92 mi)

Government
  - Council: Ahmed Riyaz

Area
  - Total: 1.68 km^{2} (0.65 sq mi)

Dimensions
  - Length: 4.000 km (2.485 mi)
  - Width: 0.480 km (0.298 mi)

Population (2014)
  - Total: 2,266 (including foreigners)
  - Density: 1,350/km^{2} (3,490/sq mi)
- Time zone: UTC+05:00 (MST)

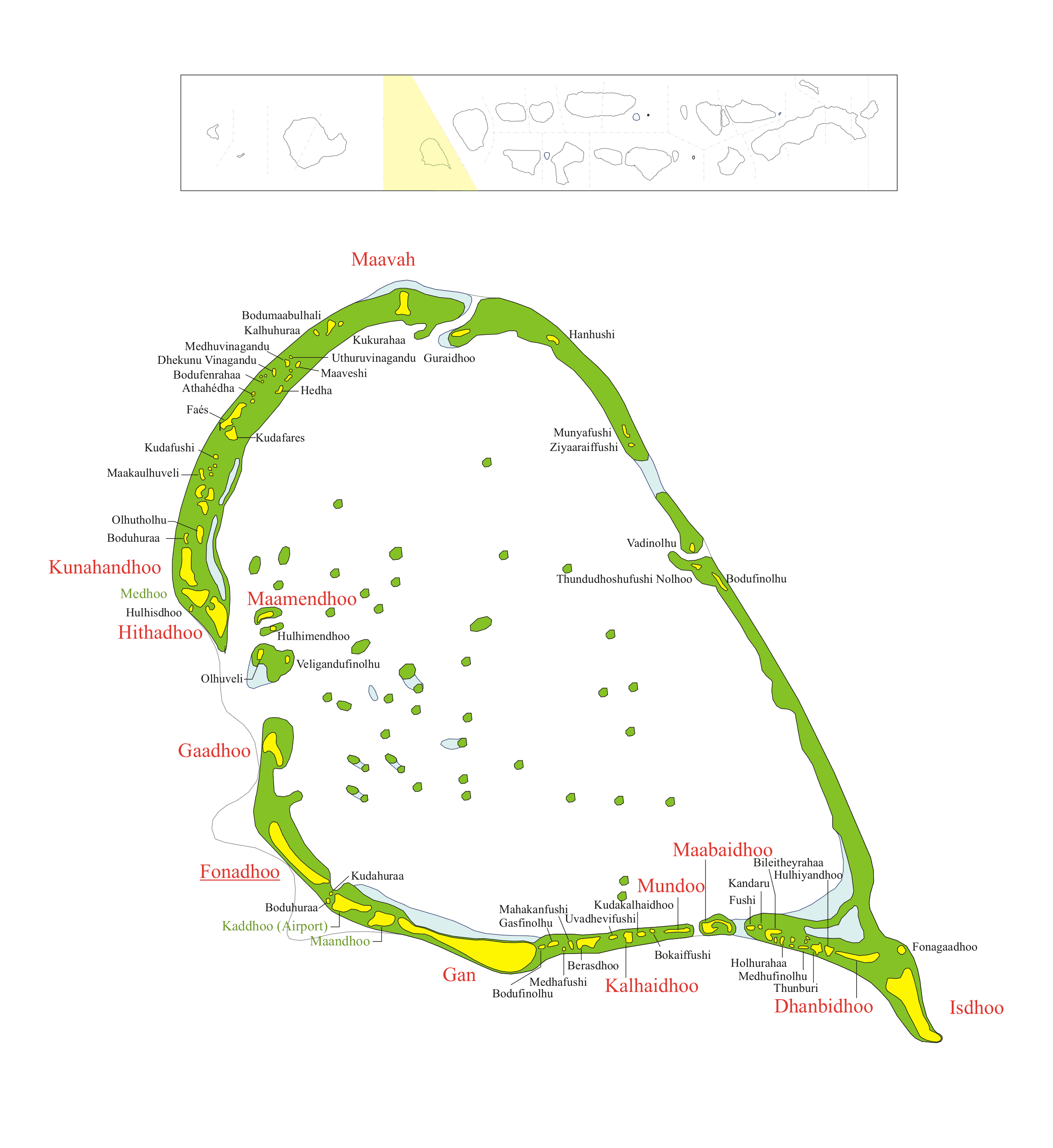
Map of Laamu Atoll and Haddhunmathi Atoll.

Fonadhoo (Dhivehi: ފޮނަދޫ) is the capital island of the Laamu Atoll of the Maldives.

The island has three villages: Barasil (northernmost), Medhuavah (in the middle) and Kurigam (southernmost). However, after the relocation of people from the neighbouring Gaadhoo, two new communities have emerged, one to the north of Baraasil and the other, south of Kurigam. The population of the island exceeded 3,000 in 2023.

== History ==
Most of the history (geological and behavioural) of Fonadhoo and its people has not been recorded. The island is considered a Gaamathee Rah - an island formed on a coral mountain, facing one side to the bay (Etherevari) and the other side to the open sea (Fuhtaru-Huvadhoo Kandu). It is believed that the island has a rich culture and is very much related to the history of the Maldives. Important historical places in the island include the Old Friday Mosque, a few sheltered tombs (Magbarah) and old mosques and cemeteries in many parts of the island.

== Geography ==
The island is 258.97 km (161 mi; 140 nmi) south of the country's capital, Malé. Being the administrative capital of Laamu Atoll, the atmosphere is vibrant with a lot of vegetation.

== Demography ==
Historical population
Year	Pop.	±%
2006	1,762	—
2014	2,101	+19.2%
2006-2014: Census populations Source:

== Economy ==
Most of the people are civil servants or workers in the Kadhdhoo Domestic Airport or the Maandhoo Fisheries Complex. Some are small scale farmers and others are self-employed. Since the last decade there are no open sea fishing boats. A few boat owners exist with small reef fishing boats and two boats that transport goods to and from Male'. The island has a low per capita income but has a regular flow of income which contributes to its slow progress.

== Education ==
Starting from the days of Bodu Madharusa, the island has had a government school which includes grades 1 to 12. There are two preschools, Arafa Preschool in Medhuavah and Barru Preschool in Barasil. The island has an average level of education with very few degree and masters holders and no PhD holders to date.

== Transport ==
The island is connected by causeway to Gan island and Kadhdhoo.
