= Lōmāfānu =

Maldivian texts in the form of copper plates

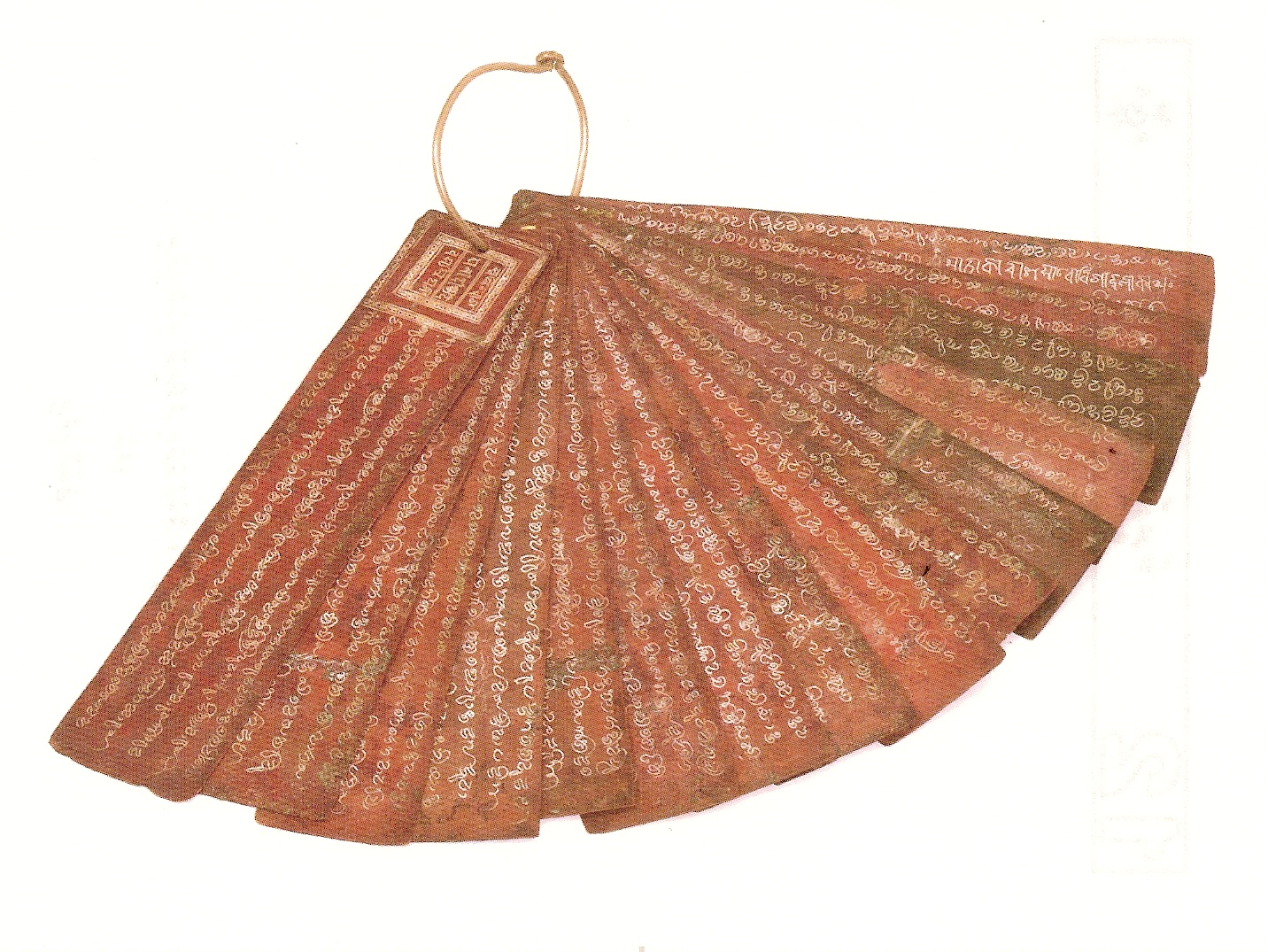
Isdhoo Loamaafaanu is the oldest copper-plate book to have been discovered in the Maldives to date. The book was written in AD 1194 (590 AH) in the Eveela form of the Divehi akuru, during the reign of Sri Gaganaaditya.

Loamaafaanu are Maldivian waqf grants in the form of copper plates on which inscriptions have been engraved. Many ancient Maldivian historical texts are found only in loamaafaanu form, with the oldest of the plates dating from the twelfth century AD. The Divehi script used on the plates was named "Eveyla Akuru" by H. C. P. Bell, who claimed that it resembled medieval Sinhala script.

According to the Isdhoo Loamaafaanu and Gamu Loamaafaanu, monks from monasteries of the southern atoll of Haddhunmathi were brought to Malé and beheaded. Beside lōmāfānu plates found in Haddhunmathi Atoll, one of the most important Maldivian copper plates is the Bodugalu Miskiy Loamaafanu found in Malé.

== List of Loamaafaanu ==
=== Laamu Atoll ===
- Isdhoo Loamaafaanu (1194 CE)
- Gamu Loamaafaanu (1194/1195 CE)
- Dhanbidhoo Loamaafaanu (1196/1197 CE)

=== Dhaalu Atoll ===
- Kudahuvadhoo Loamaafaanu (1237/1238 CE)

=== Kaafu Atoll ===
- Bodugalu Miskiyy Loamaafaanu (1356)

== List of islands mentioned in the Loamaafaanu ==
Below is a table of islands that have been mentioned in the Loamaafaanu

Island Name in the Lōmāfānu	Island Name	Geographic Atoll	Atoll Code	Inhabited?	Mentioned In
Maaranduvi	Maarandhoo	Thiladunmmathi Uthuruburi	Haa Alif	Yes	Isdhoo Loamaafaanu
Nelhivarami	Nolhivaram	Thiladunmmathi Dhekunuburi	Haa Dhaalu	Yes	Isdhoo Loamaafaanu
Komandu	Komandoo	Miladhunmadulu Uthuruburi	Shaviyani	Yes	Isdhoo Loamaafaanu
-	Neyo	Miladhunmadulu Uthuruburi	Shaviyani	No	Kudahuvadhoo Loamaafaanu
Ihavanduvi	Unknown Island	Miladhunmadulu	?	?	Isdhoo Loamaafaanu
Putivelavaru	Fushivelavaru	Miladhunmadulu Dhekunuburi	Noonu	No	Isdhoo Loamaafaanu
Vanduvi	Landhoo	Miladhunmadulu Dhekunuburi	Noonu	Yes	Isdhoo Loamaafaanu
Keduvivaru	Kedhivaru	Miladhunmadulu Dhekunuburi	Noonu	No	Isdhoo Loamaafaanu
Kedikelhu	Kendhikulhudhoo	Miladhunmadulu Dhekunuburi	Noonu	Yes	Isdhoo Loamaafaanu
Manaduvi	Manadhoo	Miladhunmadulu Dhekunuburi	Noonu	Yes	Isdhoo Loamaafaanu
Vaothi	Vavathi	Miladhunmadulu Dhekunuburi	Noonu	No	Isdhoo Loamaafaanu
Maakurathu	Maakurathu	Maalhosmadulu Uthuruburi	Raa	Yes	Isdhoo Loamaafaanu
Kunaameeduu	Meedhoo	Maalhosmadulu Uthuruburi	Raa	Yes	Isdhoo Loamaafaanu
Dakanduvi	Dhakendhoo	Maalhosmadulu Dhekunuburi	Baa	No	Isdhoo Loamaafaanu
Kisaaduu	Kihaadhoo	Maalhosmadulu Dhekunuburi	Baa	Yes	Isdhoo Loamaafaanu
Goiduvi	Goidhoo	Maalhosmadulu Dhekunuburi	Baa	Yes	Isdhoo Loamaafaanu

== See also ==
- Dhivehi writing systems
- Indian copper plate inscriptions
- Haddhunmathi Atoll
- Isdhoo (Laamu Atoll)
- Dhanbidhoo (Laamu Atoll)

== Sources ==
- Ali Najeeb, Dambidū Lōmāfānu. Council for Linguistic and Historical Research. Malé 2001.
- HCP Bell, The Maldive islands. Monograph on the History, Archaeology and Epigraphy. Reprint 1940 edn. Malé 1986.
- Bodufenvahuge Sidi. Divehi Akuru; Evvana Bai. Malé 1958.
- H.A. Maniku & G.D. Wijayawardhana, Isdhoo Loamaafaanu, Colombo 1986.
- Romero-Frias, Xavier. The Maldive Islanders, A Study of the Popular Culture of an Ancient Ocean Kingdom. Barcelona 1999.
- https://dhivehiacademy.edu.mv/18299. Kudahuvadhoo Loamafaanu Translation, Dhivehi Academy
