= Maandhoo =

Maandhoo މާންދޫ
- Inhabited island
- Location in Maldives
- Coordinates: 1°52′33.38″N 73°31′38.6″E
- Country: Maldives
- Administrative atoll: Laamu Atoll
- Distance to Malé: 254.44 km (158.10 mi)

Area
  - Total: 0.706 km^{2} (0.273 sq mi)

Dimensions
  - Length: 2 km (1.2 mi)
  - Width: 1 km (0.62 mi)

Population (12 October 2012)
  - Total: 400
  - Density: 570/km^{2} (1,500/sq mi)
- Time zone: UTC+05:00 (MST)

Mandhoo (Dhivehi: މާންދޫ) is one of the inhabited islands of Haddummati Atoll, administrative code Laamu, in the Maldives.

== Geography ==
The island is 254.44 km (158 mi; 137 nmi) south of the country's capital, Malé.

== Economy ==
This island is known for its tuna canning factory and for the STO government refrigerators. A company called Horizon Fisheries Ltd. has built a company town on the island, including all necessary facilities, in order to accommodate 1,000 employees when the work is loaded. Although, on average, there are only 400 people living on the island.
