= Laamu Atoll =

Atoll of the Maldives

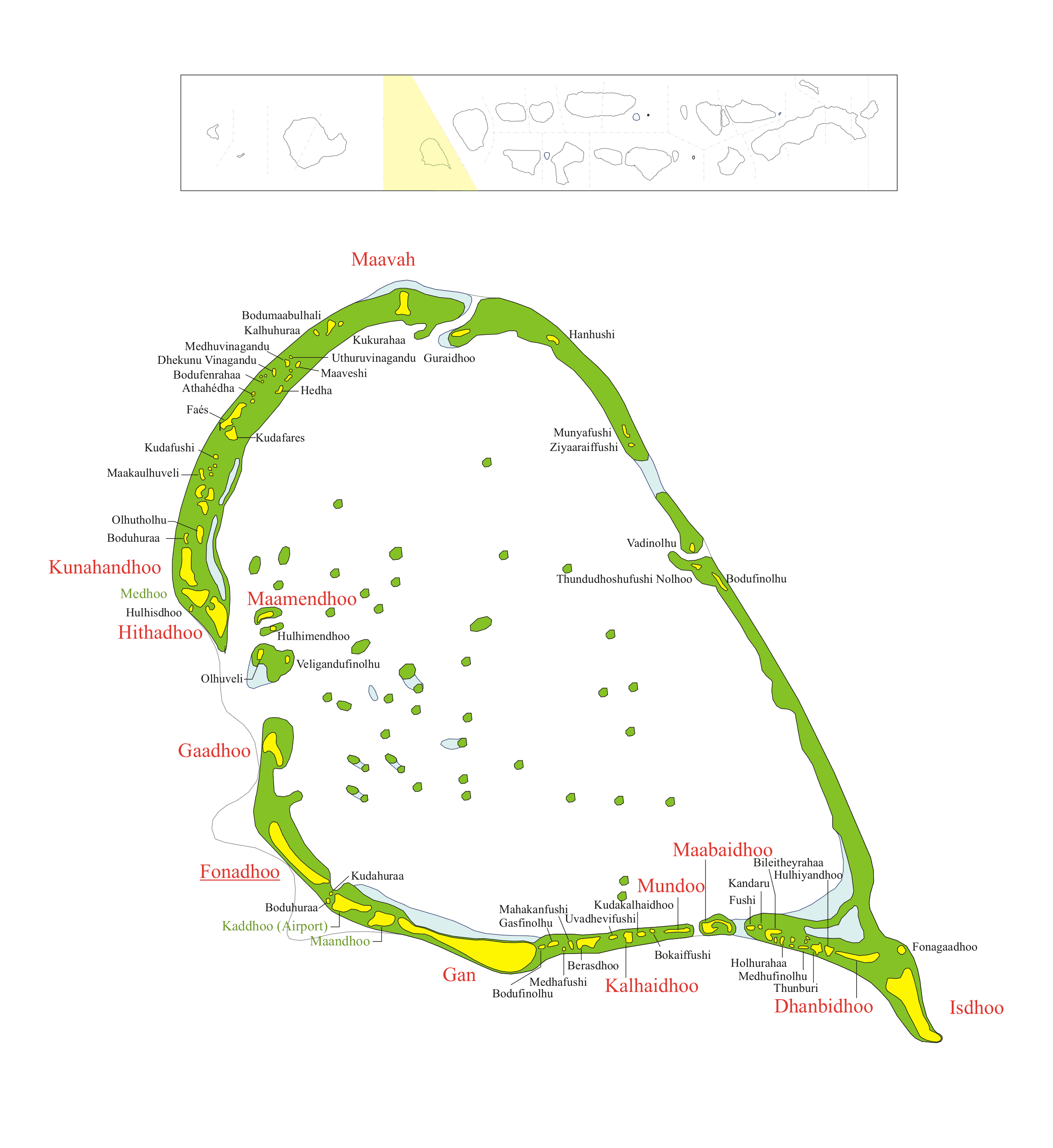

- Location of Laamu in Maldives
- Country: Maldives
- Corresponding geographic atoll(s): Haddhunmathi
- Location: 2° 08' N and 1° 47' N
- Capital: Fonadhoo

Government
  - Body: Laamu Atoll Council
  - President: Ismail Ali (PPM)

Population
  - Total: 19,468
- Letter code: O
- Dhivehi letter code: L (ލ)
  - Number of islands: 82
  - Inhabited islands: Dhanbidhoo Fonadhoo Gaadhoo Gan Hithadhoo Isdhoo Kalaidhoo Kunahandhoo Maabaidhoo Maamendhoo Maavah Mundoo Maandhoo Kadhdhoo
  - Uninhabited islands: Athahédha, Berasdhoo, Bileitheyrahaa, Bodufenrahaa, Bodufinolhu, Boduhuraa, Bodumaabulhali, Bokaiffushi, Dhekunu Vinagandu, Faés, Fonagaadhoo, Fushi, Gasfinolhu, Guraidhoo, Hanhushi, Hedha, Holhurahaa, Hulhimendhoo, Hulhisdhoo, Hulhiyandhoo, Kalhuhuraa, Kandaru, Kudafares, Kudafushi, Kudahuraa, Kudakalhaidhoo, Kukurahaa, Maakaulhuveli, Maaveshi, Mahakanfushi, Medhafushi, Medhoo, Medhufinolhu, Medhuvinagandu, Munyafushi, Olhutholhu, Olhuveli, Thunburi, Thundudhoshufushi Nolhoo, Uthuruvinagandu, Uvadhevifushi, Vadinolhu, Veligandufinolhu, Ziyaaraiffushi
- Resort islands(*), airports(¤) and industrial islands are also considered uninhabited.

Laamu Atoll (Dhivehi: ލ. އަތޮޅު), historically known as Haddhunmathi Atoll (Dhivehi: ހައްދުންމަތި އަތޮޅު), is an administrative division of the Maldives. The administrative capital is Fonadhoo Island. It corresponds to the natural atoll of the same name. It is mostly rimmed by barrier reefs, the broadest of which are topped by islands. There are many islands along its eastern and southern boundaries. This atoll is quite regular excepting for the projection of the reef at its NE corner (Isdhū Muli). It closely resembles Kolhumadulhu, its neighbour further north. Owing to its typical atoll shape, it differs in no respect from atolls in the Pacific Ocean, save for its greater size. Its reefs are generally of little breadth, with no signs of vilu (deep pools), except for its eastern fringes which are covered with islands that are quite large by Maldivian standards. The lagoon is comparatively open, containing scattered shoal patches; the bottom is muddy and the average depth is from 30 to 34 fathoms (55 to 62 m).

Haddhummathi Atoll forms the southern limit of Central Maldives. Beyond the Huvadhu Kandu, the broadest channel between atolls in the Maldives, lie the southern atolls.

== Etymology ==
Traditionally, Maldivians simply call this atoll Haddhunmathi, without adding the word Atholhu (Atoll) at the end. Before that the name of the atoll was Sathu Dhuvu mathi named after the seven main islands.

== Geography ==
It is mostly rimmed by barrier reefs, the broadest of which are topped by islands. There are many islands along its eastern and southern boundaries.

This atoll is quite regular except for the projection of the reef at its NE corner (Isdhū Muli). It closely resembles Kolhumadulhu, its neighbour further north. Owing to its typical atoll shape, it differs in no respect from atolls in the Pacific Ocean, save for its greater size. Its reefs are generally of little breadth, with no signs of vilu (deep pools), except for its eastern fringes which are covered with islands that are quite large by Maldive standards. The lagoon is comparatively open, containing scattered shoal patches; the bottom is muddy and the average depth is from 30 to 34 fathoms (55 to 62 m).

Laamu Atoll forms the southern limit of Central Maldives. Beyond the Huvadhu Kandu, the broadest channel between atolls in the Maldives, lie the southern atolls.

Kadhdhoo Domestic Airport is located on Kadhdhoo.

== Buddhism in Haddhunmathi ==
This atoll was playing an important role in the Maldives when the nation was a Buddhist Kingdom. Many of the islands located on Haddhunmathi's eastern reef have important Buddhist archaeological sites, like Dhanbidhoo, Mundoo, Gan and Isdhoo. These are remains of monasteries, viharas and stupas of large proportions.

Some of the most ancient writings of the Maldives are the Isdhoo Loamaafaanu and the Dhambidhoo Loamaafaanu copperplates, relating to the conversion to Islam, the destruction of the Buddhist monuments, the beheading of the Buddhist monks and the building of mosques to replace the Buddhist temples and monasteries. These copperplates are from the year 1193 AD. The Maldivian king back then according to these documents was Sri Gadana Aditya Maharadun. A tentative transcription of the Dhambidhoo Loamaafaanu was made by M. Ibrahim Loutfi and was subsequently published in faiythoora, the organ of the Maldivian Cultural Affairs Council.

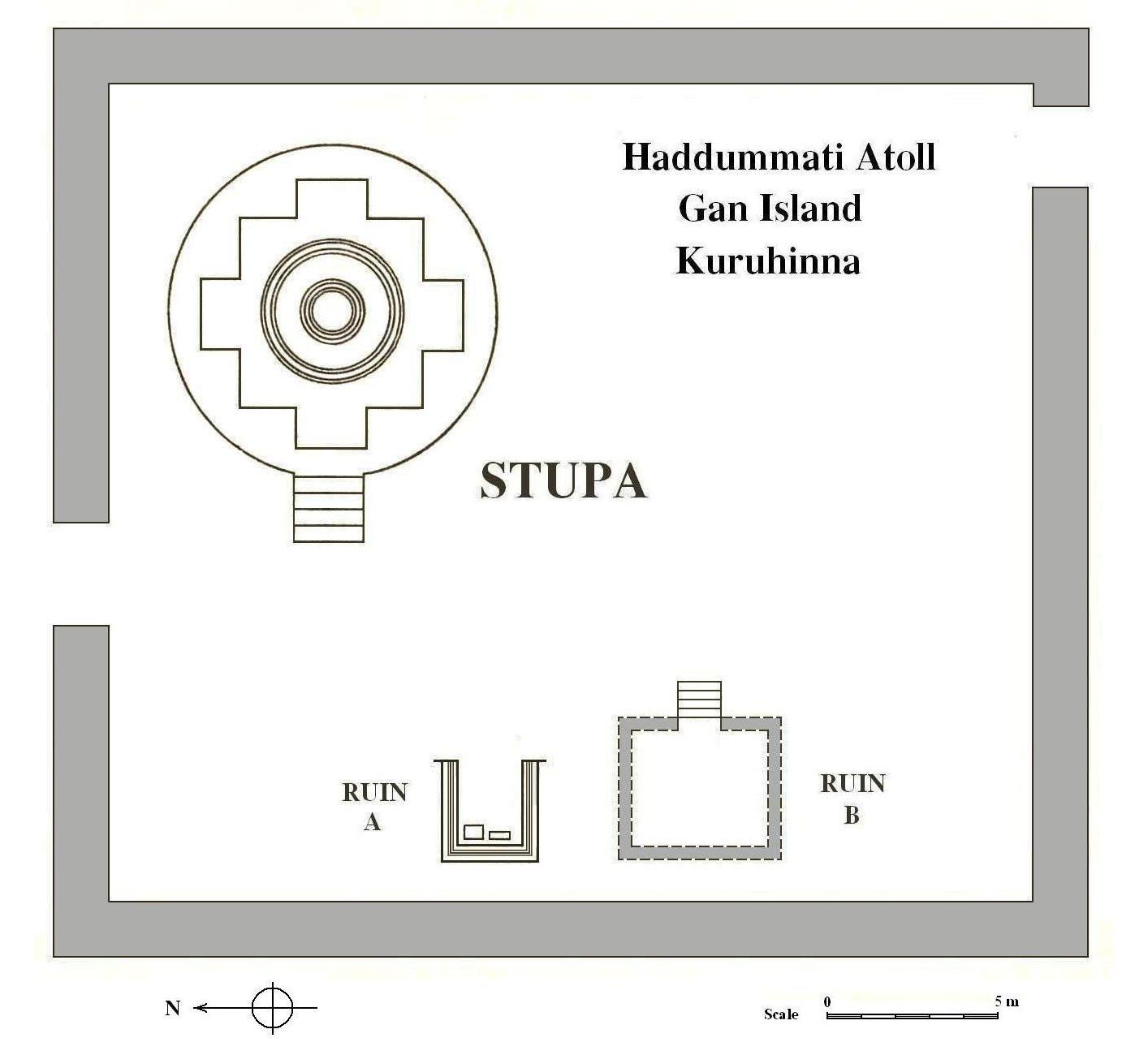
The temple compound at one of the Buddhist sites in Gan Island

H. C. P. Bell excavated some of the Buddhist sites in 1923. The stupa in Kuruhinna, one of the Buddhist sites in Gan Island, was remarkably well preserved. Only the Chattravali (Satihirutalu) was missing. Unfortunately these sites have been vandalized since then and there is almost nothing remaining now, except for a heap of stones and gravel. The cause of heavy destruction during recent years has been archaeological excavations on those sites themselves. Regrettably, these investigations were either done carelessly, or left the site unprotected after excavation. The removal of the sheltering jungle exposed the site to subsequent vandalism. Often local inhabitants plundered the place in the vain hope of finding gold or other treasures, as soon as the archaeologists and accompanying government officials left the island. The Dhambidhoo Loamaafaanu tells us that the Satihirutalu (the chattravali or chattrayashti crowning a stupa) were broken to disfigure the numerous stupas. It tells us also that statues of Vairocana, the transcendent Buddha of the middle world region, were destroyed; and the destruction was not limited to sculptures.

The wealth of manuscripts probably written on screwpine leaves that Maldivian monks in their Buddhist monasteries must have produced was either burnt or otherwise so thoroughly eliminated that it has disappeared without leaving any trace. Therefore, there are no samples of paintings from the Maldive Buddhist period itself. The only actual remains of the art of those times are a few sculptures and etchings on coral stone. Most of these are preserved in a little room in the Malé Museum, but many they are not properly labelled, so it is not easy to know where they come from.

A Buddha head found by H.C.P. Bell during his excavations in this atoll has disappeared, but the picture taken by Bell can be seen in his monograph.

== In popular culture ==
Scenes from the 2016 film, Rogue One: A Star Wars Story, were filmed here, specifically the scenes on the planet Scarif, which is portrayed as a tropical planet.

== See also ==
- History of the Maldives
- List of Star Wars filming locations
