= Harry Charles Purvis Bell =

British archaeologist (1851–1937)

H. C. P. Bell CCS
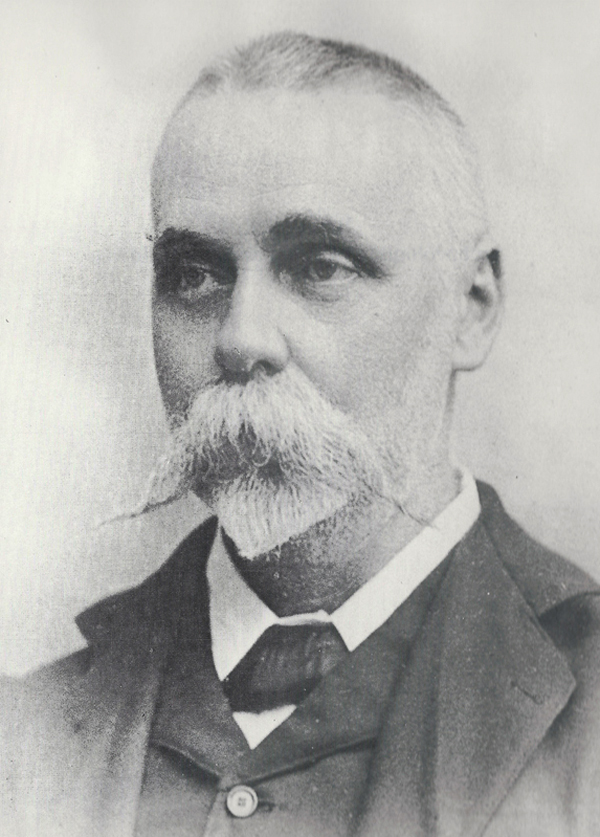
- Born: 21 September 1851; British India
- Died: 6 September 1937; Kandy, Ceylon
- Education: Cheltenham College
- Occupations: Commissioner of Archaeology, Ceylon
- Employer: The British Empire
- Spouse: Renee Sabine Fyers

Harry Charles Purvis Bell, CCS (21 September 1851 – 6 September 1937), more often known as HCP Bell, was a British civil servant and the first Commissioner of Archaeology in Ceylon.

== Early life ==
Born in British India in 1851, he was sent to England to study at Cheltenham College.

== Civil service career ==
Without going to university, Bell came to Ceylon as a civil officer in the Ceylon Civil Service and went on to serve as a customs officer. He thereafter served as a District Judge.

== Archaeology ==
In July 1890, the Governor of Ceylon, Sir Arthur Gordon, appointed Bell as the first Archaeological Commissioner and Head of the Archaeological Survey of Ceylon. He carried out many excavations in Ceylon (now Sri Lanka) for the Archaeological Survey during an appointment running from 1890 to 1912. He claimed to have dug treasures hidden in the Sigiriya and sent them to England.

After retirement, he also investigated the archaeology and epigraphy of the Maldives, where he had been earlier. and studied the linguistics of the Maldivian language. Bell had developed a good friendship with the king of the Maldives, who put his royal schooner, Fath-ul-Majid, at his disposal to carry out archaeological research in certain atolls south of Malé.

== More Information ==
Harry Charles Purvis Bell (1851-1937) was the son of a Major-General of Irish/Scottish descent, stationed in India. He was sent to England in 1864 for a public school education at Cheltenham College. After schooling, he did not enter university; instead, he spent two years tutored by a ‘Crammer’ who specialised in preparing students for the Civil Service examinations. He sat for the examination and passed it, being posted to the Ceylon Civil Service (CCS) in 1873. After several miscellaneous postings within the CCS, Governor Gordon appointed him in 1890 as the first Archaeological Commissioner and Head of the Archaeological Survey of Ceylon. Incidentally, it was called a ‘Survey’ and not a department, as the Government then believed that all items of archaeological interest could be surveyed completely in about twenty years, and after that, all operations could cease. Bell continued in the post of Archaeological Commissioner until 1912, when he retired after nearly forty years of service. Although he was entitled to several paid furloughs in Britain during this period, he never availed of them, preferring to spend his leave in Ceylon. Bell was married to Renee Sabine Fyers, the daughter of A. B. Fyers, the eighth Surveyor General of Ceylon; they had three sons and three daughters. After his retirement, he lived in Kandy, where he died in 1937.

== Works ==
- Bell, Harry Charles Purvis (1882). The Máldive Islands: An Account of the Physical Features, Climate, History, Inhabitants, Productions, and Trade. F. Luker, acting government printer, Ceylon.
- The Maldive Islands. Report on a Visit to Málé, Colombo, 1921.
- Bell, Harry Charles Purvis (1890). Anuradhpura and the North-Central Province ...: Progress Report. Government Printer, South Africa.
- Bell, Harry Charles Purvis (2002). The Máldive Islands: Monograph on the History, Archaeology and Epigraphy. Novelty Printers Publ. ISBN 978-99915-3-051-2.
- Bell, Harry Charles Purvis (1998). Excerpta Máldiviana. Asian Educational Services. ISBN 978-81-206-1221-1.

== See also ==
- Judiciary of the Maldives

== Notes ==
=== Bibliography ===
- Bell, Bethia Nancy; Bell, Heather M. (1993). H.C.P. Bell: Archaeologist of Ceylon and the Maldives. Archetype Pubs. ISBN 978-1-873132-45-6.
- Romero Frías, Xavier (2003). The Maldive Islanders: A Study of the Popular Culture of an Ancient Ocean Kingdom. Nova Ethnographia Indica. ISBN 978-84-7254-801-5.
