= Maldivian Red Crescent =

Humanitarian non-governmental organization in the Maldives

- ދިވެހި ރެޑް ކްރެސެންޓް
- Abbreviation: MRC
- Formation: 16 August 2009
- Type: Auxiliary organization to the state
- Purpose: Humanitarian, Volunteer
- Headquarters: MRC Headquarters, 2nd Floor, Plot No. 11493, Hithigas Magu
- Location: Hulhumalé, Maldives
- Region served: Maldives
- Members: International Red Cross and Red Crescent Movement
- Official language: Dhivehi, English
- Interim President: Rasheeda Ali
- Secretary General: Fathimath Himya
- 2nd Vice President: Ahmed Shabin
- Treasurer: Sharafudheen Ali
- Staff: 23
- Volunteers: 2500
- Website: www.redcrescent.org.mv

The Maldivian Red Crescent (MRC) (Dhivehi: ދިވެހި ރެޑް ކްރެސެންޓް, romanized: Dhivehi Red Crescent) is an independent, volunteer, non-profit, humanitarian organization established in the Maldives by virtue of the Maldivian Red Crescent Act (Dhivehi: ދިވެހި ރެޑް ކްރެސެންޓްގެ ޤާނޫން, romanized: Dhivehi Red Crescent'ge Gaanoonu) Law No: 7/2009

== Guiding Ethos ==
The vision of the Maldivian Red Crescent is "to be a model National Society contributing to overcome humanitarian challenges". The mission statement of the national society is "to volunteer, participate and partner in delivering humanitarian service to the most vulnerable".

As mandated by the Maldivian Red Crescent Law and the Statutes of the National Society, the primary objective of the MRC is "to prevent and alleviate suffering with complete impartiality, making no discrimination".

In addition, the volunteers, members and staff of the national society follow the Fundamental Principles of the International Red Cross and Red Crescent movement;

- Humanity
- Impartiality
- Neutrality
- Independence
- Voluntary Service
- Unity
- Universality

== Formation ==
Maldivian communities were first introduced to the International Red Cross and Red Crescent Movement in the aftermath of the Indian Ocean tsunami of 2004 which brought unprecedented devastation to the countries of the region including the Maldives.

The International Federation of Red Cross and Red Crescent Societies (IFRC) along with National Societies from numerous countries were some of the first international responders in the Maldives. Their assistance in the immediate relief and recovery stages of the disaster as well as long term recovery and rehabilitation projects helped numerous Maldivian communities to overcome the effects of the disaster.

Local individuals realized the importance and the need for having Maldives’ own national society and volunteered for its establishment. With this in mind, the volunteers, with the support of the Government of the Maldives started the process that led to the eventual formation of the Maldivian Red Crescent. This group of volunteers, with assistance from IFRC and partner national societies in the Maldives at the time began formulating the necessary documentation and legal framework for the new national society.

The Maldivian Red Crescent was officially formed with the holding of its inaugural General Assembly on 16 August 2009.

The MRC became the 187th member of the Movement at the 18th Federation General Assembly held in Geneva on 23 November 2011, having fulfilled all the conditions necessary, to be recognized as a member.

== Legal-base ==
In May 2009, the Maldivian Parliament allowed the creation of the organization. As stipulated in the law, the objectives of the national society are;

- to provide humanitarian aid to civilian and military victims, and those suffering at times of war, conflict and peace;
- to protect and assist the victims including preservation of the physical integrity and dignity of the victims at times of war, conflict and peace;
- to contribute to the improvement of the conditions of the weak and the vulnerable; in times of ill health, in prevention of diseases, and in response to all humanitarian emergencies;
- to provide support to Government Organizations assisting the victims and those effected by disaster and natural causes.

In addition, the Law recognizes the role of the MRC as an auxiliary to the public authorities in the humanitarian field. The Law stipulates the exclusive usage of the "red crescent' emblem by the MRC.

== Structure ==
The Maldivian Red Crescent is a membership driven organization. The members of the national society are registered at the branch level (typically in atolls), whereas activities and volunteers are active at Unit level (typically Islands). Members of the society form the governance structure, with unit boards and branch boards being elected. Each year representatives of the branches convene to hold the national General Assembly, which is the highest decision making authority of the society. In between the Assemblies, the society is governed by the Governing Board, which is elected by the General Assembly for a term of two years.

Branch	Units
Haa Dhaalu (HDH)	Kulhudhuffushi
Haa Dhaalu (HDH)	Nolhivaram
Noonu (N)	Manadhoo
Noonu (N)	Holhudhoo
Lhaviyani (LH)	Naifaru
Lhaviyani (LH)	Olhuvelifushi
Male' City Branch	Henveiru
Male' City Branch	Villingili
Meemu (M)	Muli
Meemu (M)	Kolhufushi
Thaa (TH)	Veymandoo
Thaa (TH)	Burunee
Gaafu Alifu (GA)	Villingili
Gaafu Alifu (GA)	Gemanafushi
Gaafu Dhaalu (GDH)	Thinadhoo
Gaafu Dhaalu (GDH)	Vaadhoo
Gnaviyani (GN)	North
Gnaviyani (GN)	South
Seenu (S)	Hithadhoo
Seenu (S)	Hulhumeedhoo

The Maldivian Red Crescent headquarters is in Hulhumalé.

== Services ==
The organisation mainly focuses on three areas. Areas include Disaster Management, Health and well-being and Youth empowerment. Looking into the services more briefly, it can be classified as First Aid Services, Emergency Response, Bed to Bed patient transportation, Epidemic control and many more.

== Training ==
Maldivian Red Crescent offers a wide range of training programs to develop its volunteers. The most elite training program is the "National Emergence Response Team" Training (NERT). Other programs include "Emergency Response Team Induction Training", "Standard First Aid Training (SFA)", Epidemic Control for Volunteers, Basic First Aid, Emergency Life Support.
