= Olhugiri =

Olhugiri may refer to the following places:

- Olhugiri, Baa Atoll, Maldives
- Olhugiri, Kolhumadulu Atoll, Maldives
