= Vilufushi =

Vilufushi ވިލުފުށި
- Inhabited island
- Location in Maldives
- Coordinates: 02°30′18″N 73°18′15″E
- Country: Maldives
- Administrative atoll: Thaa Atoll
- Distance to Malé: 186.09 km (115.63 mi)

Dimensions
  - Length: 0.18766 km (0.11661 mi)
  - Width: 0.250 km (0.155 mi)

Population (2022)
  - Total: 1,081
- Time zone: UTC+05:00 (MST)

Vilufushi (Dhivehi: ވިލުފުށި) is an inhabited island in Maldives.

== History ==
The island was very highly impacted by the 2004 tsunami, and the entire population was displaced to other islands. The government then took the opportunity to expand the area of the island with a land reclamation scheme and the population was returned to the island in 2009. With the help of foreign aid, new facilities were built, and fundamental needs provided for residents.

== Geography ==
The island is 186.09 km (116 mi; 100 nmi) south of the country's capital, Malé. Vilufushi belongs to the North Central province of the Maldives, according to government documents. It was also named Thaa Atoll, an administrative constituency.

== Demography ==
Historical population
Year	Pop.	±%
2006	16	—
2014	976	+6000.0%
2022	1,081	+10.8%
2006–2022: Census populations Source:

== Economy ==
Vilufushi is known for the various kinds of fishing available. Facilities have been rebuilt with the help of foreign aid, following the 2004 tsunami.
