= Kinbidhoo =

Kinbidhoo ކިނބިދޫ
- Inhabited island

- Location in Maldives
- Coordinates: 02°10′08″N 73°03′52″E
- Country: Maldives
- Administrative atoll: Thaa Atoll
- Distance to Malé: 227.29 km (141.23 mi)

Dimensions
  - Length: 0.930 km (0.578 mi)
  - Width: 0.675 km (0.419 mi)

Population (2014)
  - Total: 768 (including foreigners)
- Time zone: UTC+05:00 (MST)

Kinbidhoo (Dhivehi: ކިނބިދޫ) is one of the inhabited islands of Thaa Atoll. In the order of the inhabited islands, Kinbidhoo is the 12th island and the island code is N-12. Post code for the island is 14120. The island is famous for its rich unique Maldivian culture and traditions that have been preserved to date. The Eid celebrations and wedding traditions of Kinbidhoo are unique to the island and have been practiced since the days of the ancestors of Kinbidhoo. Kinbidhoo is a lively island with a certain uniqueness to it. The people of the island carry out the traditional activities of thatch making and coir rope producing. All the raw materials required for this, such as dry coconut palm leaves and coconut husks are obtained from nearby islands or from Kinbidhoo itself. In addition, some islanders go to the reef to collect exotic sea cucumbers which are then treated and sent to the capital island for exportation. Kinbidhoo has always been the educational hub of Thaa atoll. Students from all over the atoll and nearby islands used to come to Kinbidhoo to obtain the good quality education provided by Kinbidhoo School. Kinbidhoo School is known countrywide for the quality of education provided, outstanding results obtained in exams, and the implementation of their own teaching module known as the KS method. Kinbidhoo School was also a pilot school for implementing the new Maldivian curriculum which is used to teach all schools of Maldives now.

== History ==
=== Archaeology ===
There were important Buddhist ruins in an area of this island. The islanders call this place Veyru. The most conspicuous was a large Stupa whose stones had been removed and looked like a very steep small hill. Muhammad Ismāīl Dīdī, led a Maldivian expedition to this island in order to explore the Buddhist ruins in the 1960s. Some excavations were conducted and a report on the Buddhist remains of Kinbidhoo Island was published.

Unfortunately the Buddhist site was not protected after excavation and has been heavily vandalized in recent times. The steep hill that marked the location of the ancient Stupa has been almost flattened out. That place is facing erosion.

=== 2004 tsunami ===
Kinbidhoo was struck by the tsunami that followed the Indian Ocean earthquake on 26 December 2004, which swept across the western coast of Sumatra and the whole island flooded completely, destroying some houses and farms, although there were no casualties.

== Geography ==
The island is 227.29 km (141 mi; 123 nmi) south of the country's capital, Malé. Kinbidhoo is situated closest to Veymandoo, the capital of Tha Atoll. Kinbidhoo sits on a huge coral reef on which 14 other islands emerge. The closest uninhabited island to Kinbidhoo is called Kudadhoo and it is less than 200 meters away from Kinbidhoo. and there was a Small island Behind Kinbidhoo connected with wooden Bridge.

== Demography ==
Historical population
Year	Pop.	±%
2006	808	—
2014	764	−5.4%
2006-2014: Census populations Source:
