= Shaviyani =

Shaviyani may refer to:

- Shaviyani Atoll, an administrative division of the Maldives.
- Shaviyani, the second consonant of the Thaana abugaida used in Dhivehi.
