= Veymandoo Kandu =

Channel in the Maldives between Thaa Atoll and Laamu Atoll

Veymandoo Kandu is the channel between Thaa Atoll and Laamu Atoll of the Maldives.
