= Old Dhivehi =

Earliest form of Maldivian language

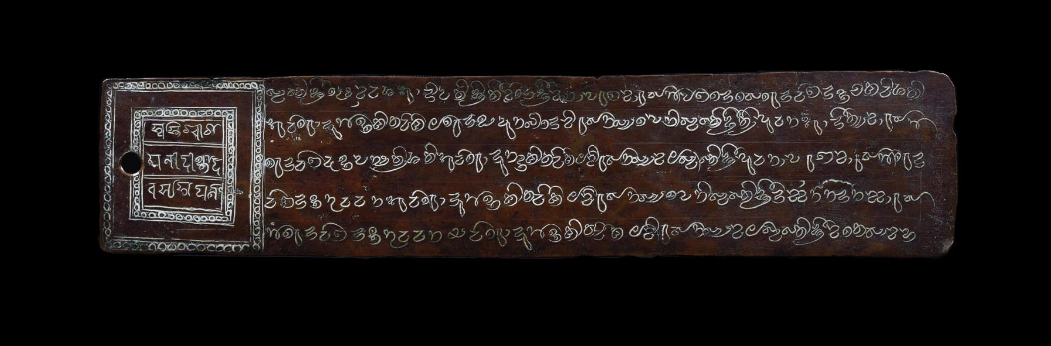
- Dhanbidhoo Loamaafaanu (1195 CE) is written in the Old Dhivehi language
- Region: Maldives
- Era: 12-13th century CE
- Language family: Indo-European: Indo-Iranian; Indo-Aryan; Southern Zone; Insular Indo-Aryan; Elu; Old Dhivehi
- Writing system: Eveylaa akuru (older variant of Dhives Akuru)

Language codes
- ISO 639-3: –

Old Dhivehi is the earliest attested form of the Maldivian language, with records found in the Loamaafaanu from the 12th and 13th centuries CE, as well as various Buddhist texts dating back to the 6th century CE. It is the ancestral form that evolved into the modern northern dialect of the Dhivehi language. Old Dhivehi belongs to Indo-Aryan branch of the wider Indo-European language family.

No endonym for the language is known. However the language may have been called "Dhuvesi" or "Dhivesi" meaning "Islander", which has evolved into the endonym for the modern language.

== History ==
Old Dhivehi descends through Proto Dhivehi-Sinhala or Elu spoken in 3rd century BCE. Around 1st century BCE, the unattested Proto-Dhivehi, the direct ancestor to all Maldivian dialects, started to separate from Elu prakrit. Proto-Dhivehi came to be influenced by subcontinental Middle Indo-Aryan dialects and Dravidian languages.

== Phonology ==
Vowel inventory of Old Dhivehi is mostly identical to that of modern Dhivehi. Like Sinhala and Dravidian and unlike most Indo-Aryan languages, spoken Old Dhivehi distinguished between long and short forms of [e, eː] and [o, oː]. However these were not distinguished in writing.

Vowels
	Front		Central		Back	
	short	long	short	long	short	long
Close	i	iː			u	uː
Mid	e	eː			o	oː
Open			a	aː		

- Modern [æː] developed as an independent phoneme from the Old Dhivehi diphthong /ai/.

Consonants
	Labial		Dental/ Alveolar		Retroflex		Palatal	Velar		Glottal
Nasal		m		n		ɳ	ɲ			
Stop/ Affricate	p	b ᵐb	t̪	d̪ ⁿd̪	ʈ	ɖ ᶯɖ		k	ɡ ᵑɡ	
Fricative			s̪							h
Approximant		ʋ		l̪		ɭ	j			
Tap						ɽ				

- The Old Dhivehi consonant inventory was more limited compared to that of modern Dhivehi, as the phonemes of /f/, /z̪/, /d͡ʒ/, /t͡ʃ/ and /ʃ/ had not evolved.
- OIA sibilants historically merged /ʃ/ and /ʂ/ into /s/.
- The Old Dhivehi consonant clusters /dj/ and /tj/ evolved into later /d͡ʒ/ and /t͡ʃ/ respectively.
- Prenasalized consonants existed in the spoken form of Old Dhivehi, however were not written down.
- Modern Dhivehi ށ /ʂ/ is a reflex of OIA and Old Dhivehi /ʈ/ rather than OIA /ʂ/.
- Old Dhivehi contrasted between the retroflex nasal ޱ [ɳ] and dental nasal ނ [n̪].
- Old Dhivehi /p/ shifted to /f/ after the 17th century.
- Vowel backing of Old Dhivehi /e/ to /o/ before retroflexes occurred after the 13th century.

== Grammar ==
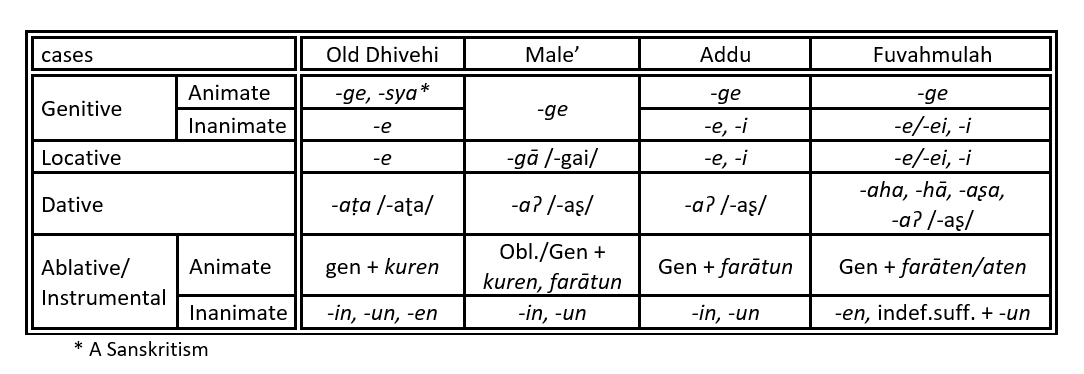
Comparison of case suffixes between Old Dhivehi, Modern Standard Dhivehi (Male'), Addu and Fuvahmulah dialects

== Vocabulary ==
Old Dhivehi	Dhives Akuru	Modern Dhivehi	Thaana	English
Puʈi	𑤠𑤳𑤖𑤱	Fuʂi	ފުށި	Islet
Pavuru	𑤠𑤩𑤳𑤧𑤳	Fāru	ފާރު	Wall
Ateɭu	𑤀𑤛𑤵𑤮𑤳	Atoɭu	އަތޮޅު	Atoll
Malu	𑤤𑤨𑤳	Mā	މާ	Flower
Raʈu	𑤧𑤖𑤳	Raʂ	ރަށް	Island/Country
Keɭu	𑤌𑤵𑤮𑤳	Koɭu	ކޮޅު	end/piece
Simu	𑤬𑤱𑤤𑤳	In	އިން	Border
Saᶯdu	𑤬𑤿𑤝𑤳	Haᶯdu	ހަނދު	Moon
Doruveʈi	𑤝𑤸𑤧𑤳𑤩𑤵𑤖𑤱	Dorōʂi	ދޮރޯށި	Gate
