= Gaadhiffushi =

Gaadhiffushi may refer to the following places in the Maldives:

- Gaadhiffushi (Dhaalu Atoll)
- Gaadhiffushi (Thaa Atoll)
