= Kaafu =

Kaafu may refer to:

- Kaafu Atoll, an administrative division of the Maldives
- Thaana, the seventh consonant of the Thaana abugaida used in Dhivehi
