= Thaana (Unicode block) =

- Range: U+0780..U+07BF (64 code points)
- Plane: BMP
- Scripts: Thaana
- Major alphabets: Dhivehi
- Assigned: 50 code points
- Unused: 14 reserved code points

Unicode version history
- 3.0 (1999): 49 (+49)
- 3.2 (2002): 50 (+1)

Unicode documentation
- Code chart ∣ Web page

Thaana is a Unicode block containing characters for the Thaana script used for writing the Dhivehi and Arabic languages in the Maldives.

Thaana^{[1]}^{[2]} Official Unicode Consortium code chart (PDF)
	0	1	2	3	4	5	6	7	8	9	A	B	C	D	E	F
U+078x	ހ	ށ	ނ	ރ	ބ	ޅ	ކ	އ	ވ	މ	ފ	ދ	ތ	ލ	ގ	ޏ
U+079x	ސ	ޑ	ޒ	ޓ	ޔ	ޕ	ޖ	ޗ	ޘ	ޙ	ޚ	ޛ	ޜ	ޝ	ޞ	ޟ
U+07Ax	ޠ	ޡ	ޢ	ޣ	ޤ	ޥ	ަ	ާ	ި	ީ	ު	ޫ	ެ	ޭ	ޮ	ޯ
U+07Bx	ް	ޱ														
Notes: 1. As of Unicode version 16.0; 2. Grey areas indicate non-assigned code points

== History ==
The following Unicode-related documents record the purpose and process of defining specific characters in the Thaana block:

Version	Final code points (Note: Proposed code points and characters names may differ from final code points and names)	Count	UTC ID	L2 ID	WG2 ID	Document
3.0	U+0780..07B0	49	UTC/1991-100			McGowan, Rick (1991-10-25), Maldivian (Dihevi) block description and chart draft
3.0	U+0780..07B0	49		L2/97-036	N1519R	Everson, Michael (1997-05-30), Proposal for encoding the Thaana script in ISO/IEC 10646
3.0	U+0780..07B0	49		L2/97-197		Jenkins, John; Everson, Michael (1997-05-30), Thaana proposal
3.0	U+0780..07B0	49		L2/97-288	N1603	Umamaheswaran, V. S. (1997-10-24), "8.16", Unconfirmed Meeting Minutes, WG 2 Meeting # 33, Heraklion, Crete, Greece, 20 June – 4 July 1997
3.0	U+0780..07B0	49		L2/97-255R		Aliprand, Joan (1997-12-03), "Maldividan (Thaana)", Approved Minutes – UTC #73 & L2 #170 joint meeting, Palo Alto, CA – August 4-5, 1997
3.0	U+0780..07B0	49		L2/98-161	N1699	Everson, Michael (1998-03-10), Thaana new code chart and name list
3.0	U+0780..07B0	49		L2/98-173		Text for PDAM registration and consideration ballot for ISO 10646-1 Amendment 24 - Thaana, 1998-05-11
3.0	U+0780..07B0	49		L2/98-158		Aliprand, Joan; Winkler, Arnold (1998-05-26), "Thaana", Draft Minutes – UTC #76 & NCITS Subgroup L2 #173 joint meeting, Tredyffrin, Pennsylvania, April 20-22, 1998
3.0	U+0780..07B0	49		L2/98-286	N1703	Umamaheswaran, V. S.; Ksar, Mike (1998-07-02), "8.16", Unconfirmed Meeting Minutes, WG 2 Meeting #34, Redmond, WA, USA; 1998-03-16--20
3.0	U+0780..07B0	49			N1834	Summary of Voting/Table of Replies - Amendment 24 - Thaana, 1998-08-27
3.0	U+0780..07B0	49		L2/98-323	N1909	ISO/IEC 10646-1/FPDAM 24, AMENDMENT 24: Thaana, 1998-10-23
3.0	U+0780..07B0	49		L2/99-010	N1903 (pdf, html, doc)	Umamaheswaran, V. S. (1998-12-30), "6.7.7", Minutes of WG 2 meeting 35, London, U.K.; 1998-09-21--25
3.0	U+0780..07B0	49		L2/99-232	N2003	Umamaheswaran, V. S. (1999-08-03), "6.2.7 FPDAM24 – Thaana script", Minutes of WG 2 meeting 36, Fukuoka, Japan, 1999-03-09--15
3.2	U+07B1	1		L2/00-120		Nelson, Paul; Beam, Paul; Gadir, Mohamen Abdul (2000-04-07), Proposal to add characters for use with Thaana Script (Divehi language)
3.2	U+07B1	1		L2/00-115R2		Moore, Lisa (2000-08-08), "Thaana", Minutes Of UTC Meeting #83
3.2	U+07B1	1		L2/00-187		Moore, Lisa (2000-08-23), "Motion 84-M5", UTC minutes -- Boston, August 8-11, 2000
3.2	U+07B1	1		L2/00-328	N2264	Whistler, Ken (2000-09-19), Proposal for Encoding Thaana letter Naa in the BMP
3.2	U+07B1	1		L2/01-050	N2253	Umamaheswaran, V. S. (2001-01-21), "Resolution M39.21 (Thaana Letter Naa)", Minutes of the SC2/WG2 meeting in Athens, September 2000
