= Vandhoo =

Vandhoo ވަންދޫ
- Inhabited island

- Location in Maldives
- Coordinates: 02°17′25″N 72°56′30″E
- Country: Maldives
- Administrative atoll: Thaa Atoll
- Distance to Malé: 217.76 km (135.31 mi)

Dimensions
  - Length: 0.720 km (0.447 mi)
  - Width: 0.600 km (0.373 mi)

Population (2022)
  - Total: 364
- Time zone: UTC+05:00 (MST)

Vandhoo (Dhivehi: ވަންދޫ) is one of the inhabited islands of Thaa Atoll.

== History ==
According to some historical scripts, Vandhoo used to be an economical hub where ships travelled through Maldives, used to load and unload goods while transiting near Vandhoo lagoon in early days.

== Geography ==
The island is 217.76 km (135 mi; 118 nmi) south of the country's capital, Malé.

== Demography ==
Historical population
Year	Pop.	±%
2006	268	—
2014	275	+2.6%
2022	364	+32.4%
2006–2022: Census populations Source:

According to early census statistics, Vandhoo was one of the most populated islands in the atoll in 1911, when the total population numbered over 1,000. Due to poverty and government-initiated birth control programs, the population has since decreased to less than 300 in 2014.
