= Kandoodhoo =

Kandoodhoo ކަނޑޫދޫ
- Inhabited island
- Location in Maldives
- Coordinates: 02°19′15″N 72°55′00″E
- Country: Maldives
- Administrative atoll: Thaa Atoll
- Distance to Malé: 215.36 km (133.82 mi)

Dimensions
  - Length: 1.775 km (1.103 mi)
  - Width: 0.600 km (0.373 mi)

Population (2022)
  - Total: 456
- Time zone: UTC+05:00 (MST)

Kandoodhoo (Dhivehi: ކަނޑޫދޫ) is one of the inhabited islands of Thaa Atoll.

== Geography ==
The island is 215.36 km (134 mi; 116 nmi) south of the country's capital, Malé.

== Demography ==
Historical population
Year	Pop.	±%
2006	347	—
2014	370	+6.6%
2022	456	+23.2%
2006–2022: Census populations Source:
