= Guraidhoo =

Guraidhoo may refer to the following places in the Maldives:

- Guraidhoo (Kaafu Atoll)
- Guraidhoo (Laamu Atoll)
- Guraidhoo (Thaa Atoll)
