= Madifushi =

Madifushi may refer to the following places in the Maldives:

- Madifushi (Meemu Atoll)
- Madifushi (Thaa Atoll)
