= Omadhoo (Thaa Atoll) =

Omadhoo އޮމަދޫ
- Inhabited island
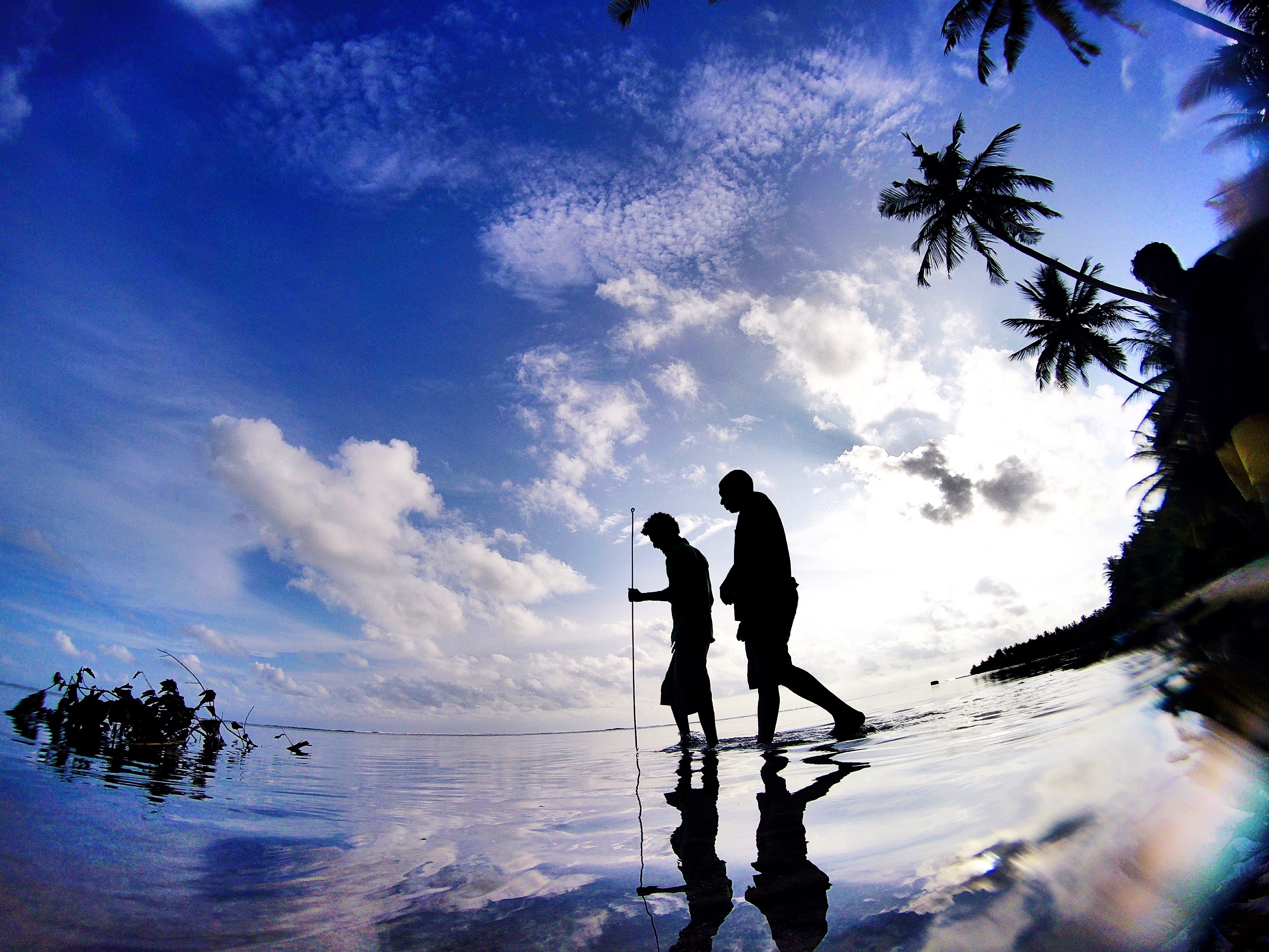

- Location in Maldives
- Coordinates: 02°10′01″N 73°01′25″E
- Country: Maldives
- Administrative atoll: Thaa Atoll
- Distance to Malé: 228.53 km (142.00 mi)

Dimensions
  - Length: 1.075 km (0.668 mi)
  - Width: 0.300 km (0.186 mi)

Population (2022)
  - Total: 417
- Time zone: UTC+05:00 (MST)

Omadhoo (Dhivehi: އޮމަދޫ) is one of the inhabited islands of Thaa Atoll.

== Geography ==
The island is 228.53 km (142 mi; 123 nmi) south of the country's capital, Malé.

== Demography ==
Historical population
Year	Pop.	±%
2006	365	—
2014	415	+13.7%
2022	417	+0.5%
2006-2022: Census populations Source:
