= Gaadhiffushi (Thaa Atoll) =

Gaadhiffushi ގާދިއްފުށި
- Inhabited island
- Location in Maldives
- Coordinates: 2°15′9.58″N 73°12′46.44″E
- Country: Maldives
- Administrative atoll: Thaa Atoll
- Distance to Malé: 215.13 km (133.68 mi)

Dimensions
  - Length: 0.650 km (0.404 mi)
  - Width: 0.360 km (0.224 mi)

Population (2022)
  - Total: 317
- Time zone: UTC+05:00 (MST)

Gaadhiffushi (Dhivehi: ގާދިއްފުށި) is one of the inhabited islands of Thaa Atoll.

== Geography ==
The island is 215.13 km (134 mi; 116 nmi) south of the country's capital, Malé.

== Demography ==
Historical population
Year	Pop.	±%
2006	198	—
2014	239	+20.7%
2022	317	+32.6%
Census populations Source:
