= Burunee =

Burunee ބުރުނީ
- Inhabited island
- Location in Maldives
- Coordinates: 02°33′30″N 73°06′25″E
- Country: Maldives
- Administrative atoll: Thaa Atoll
- Distance to Malé: 184.29 km (114.51 mi)

Dimensions
  - Length: 1.450 km (0.901 mi)
  - Width: 0.325 km (0.202 mi)

Population (2022)
  - Total: 414
- Time zone: UTC+05:00 (MST)

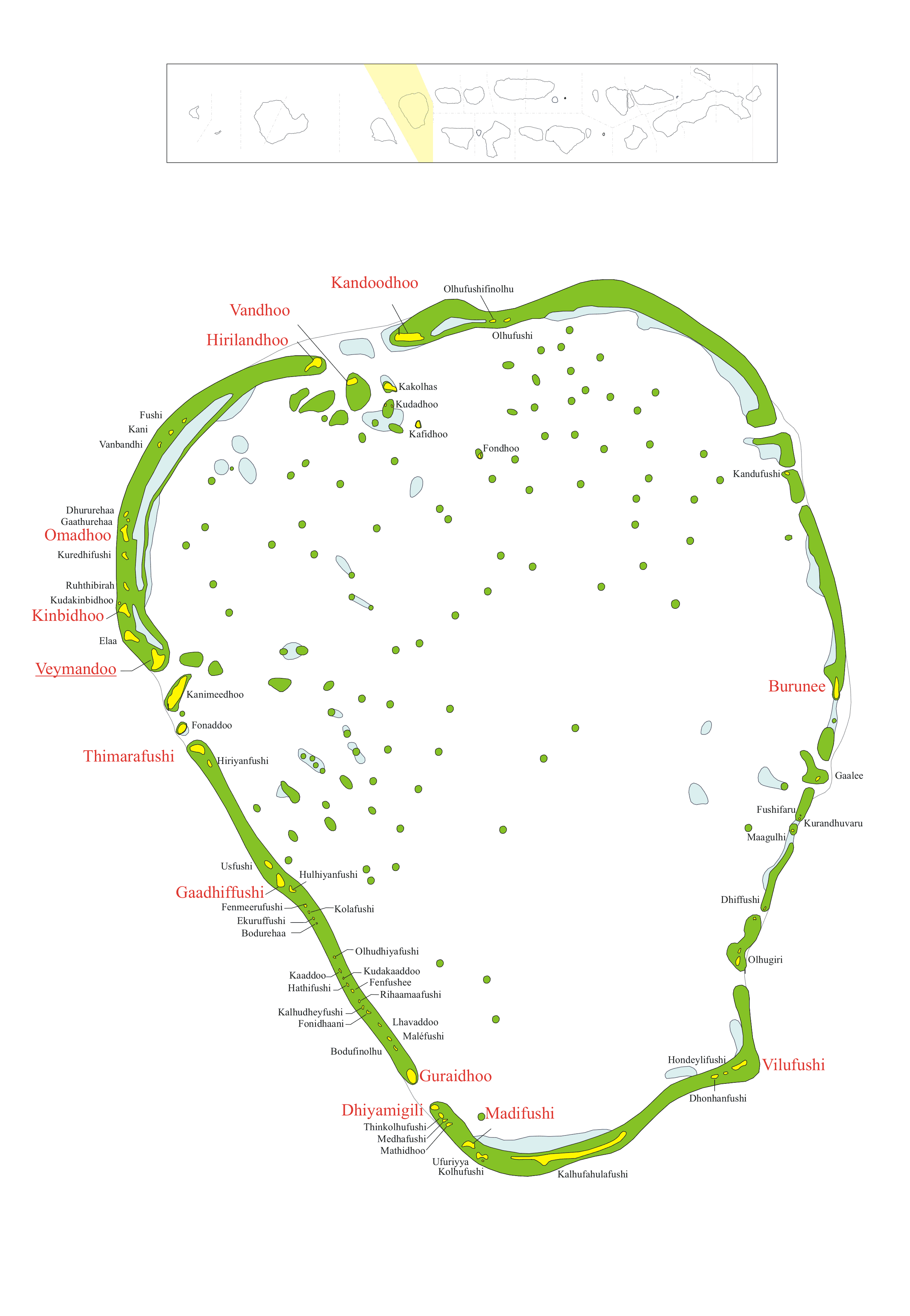
Detailed map of the Thaa Attoll with Burunee in the central right

Burunee (Dhivehi: ބުރުނީ) is one of the inhabited islands of Thaa Atoll.

== Geography ==
The island is 184.29 km (115 mi; 100 nmi) south of the country's capital, Malé.

== Demography ==
Historical population
Year	Pop.	±%
2006	1,130	—
2014	312	−72.4%
2022	414	+32.7%
2006-2022: Census populations Source:
