= Maldivian Sign Language =

Deaf-community sign language

- ދިވެހި އިޝާރާތް ބަސް
- Native to: Maldives
- Native speakers: 2,700 (no date)
- Language family: Deaf-community sign language:

Language codes
- ISO 639-3: –

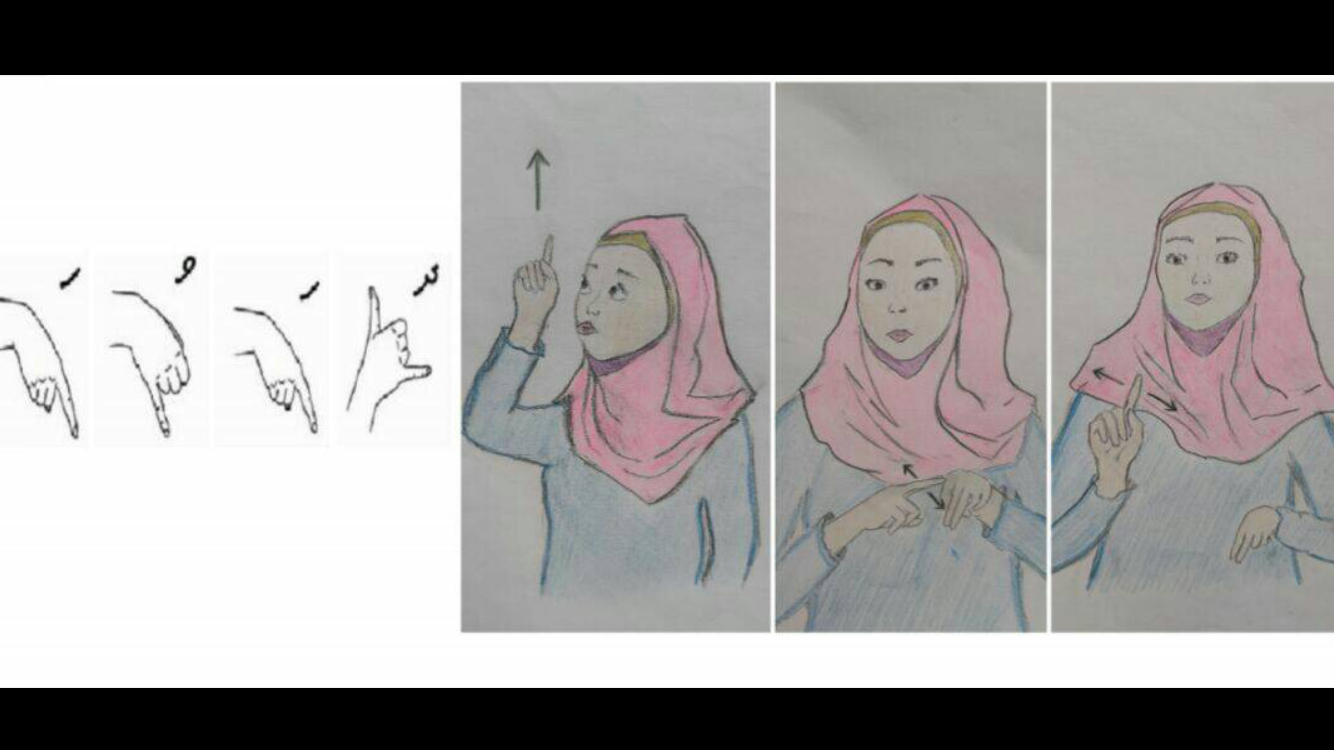
Maldivian Sign Language

Maldivian Sign Language (MvSL; Dhivehi: ދިވެހި އިޝާރާތް ބަސް) is a sign language that was developed, largely spontaneously, by deaf children in a number of schools in Maldives in the 2000s. It is of particular interest to the linguists who study it because it offers a unique opportunity to study what they believe to be the birth of a new language.

The dictionary contains signs for around 650 words supported with English and Dhivehi description explaining the hand-shape and the movement to be used while signing a particular word.
