= Malé Latin =

Latin alphabet for the Maldivian language

Dhivehi Latin or Maldivian Latin, known colloquially as Malé Latin or Nasiri Latin, is a romanisation of Maldivian introduced in the Maldives in 1976. Malé Latin is widely used in for romanising Maldivian.

== History ==
Toward the mid-1970s, during President Ibrahim Nasir's tenure, teleprinters were introduced to the local administration. The new telex equipment was viewed as a great progress, yet the local Thaana script was deemed to be an obstacle because messages on the machines could be written only in the Latin script. Following this, a Latin transliteration was approved by the Maldivian government in 1976 and was quickly implemented by the administration. Booklets were printed and dispatched to all atoll and island offices, as well as schools and merchant liners.

This official Latin script has been criticized by several scholars because the transliteration of vowels did not follow the consistency of the Thaana alphabet and was more difficult to master for Maldivian learners. In the Maldivian alphabet there is one single diacritical sign (fili) for 'a' 'e' 'i' and 'u', and this single sign is repeated when the sound is lengthened. In the new romanization only one of the short vowels is consistent with the way of the traditional script "aa", but most long vowels "oo", "ee", "ey" and "oa" are pronounced as in English.

Anthropologist Clarence Maloney notes that the use of th and dh to represent unaspirated dental consonants but lh for retroflex l is confusing and misleading, as in IAST, the most common transcription method for Indic languages, the first two would be read as aspirated consonants and the latter, which is instead a retroflex, as an aspirated "l".

The new romanization also used aberrant combinations of letters and apostrophes for some Arabic sounds, effectively ignoring the Arabic transliterations accepted in academic circles worldwide.

The Thaana script was reinstated by President Maumoon Abdul Gayoom shortly after he took power in 1978.

Romanization of the Arabithaana scripts; CONSONANTS
Arabithaana	HTML Unicode	Maldivian Latin	SAMT Romanization	Observations	IPA value
ހ and ﻫ	&#1920;	h	h		[h]
ށ	&#1921;	sh (rh) (Note: The romanization in parentheses is the older romanization, as the pronunciation of the letter shaviyani ށ has changed over time.)	ṣ (ṛ)	No Arabic equivalent	[ʂ]
ނ and ن	&#1922;	n	n		[n]
ރ and ر	&#1923;	r	r		[r]
ބ and ب	&#1924;	b	b		[b]
ޅ	&#1925;	lh	ḷ	No Arabic equivalent	[ɭ]
ކ and ك	&#1926;	k	k		[k]
އ and ا	&#1927;	only carried vowel written	only carried vowel written		[ʔ]
ވ and و	&#1928;	v	v		[ʋ]
މ and م	&#1929;	m	m		[m]
ފ and ف	&#1930;	f	f		[f]
ދ and د	&#1931;	dh	d		[d̪]
ތ and ت	&#1932;	th	t		[t̪]
ލ and ل	&#1933;	l	l		[l]
ގ	&#1934;	g	g	No Arabic equivalent	[ɡ]
ޏ	&#1935;	gn / ny	ñ	No Arabic equivalent	[ɲ]
ސ and س	&#1936;	s	s		[s̪]
ޑ	&#1937;	d	ḍ	No Arabic equivalent	[ɖ]
ޱ	&#1938	n	n̹	No Arabic equivalent	[ɳ]
ޒ and ز	&#1939;	z	z		[z]
ޓ	&#1940;	t	ṭ	No Arabic equivalent	[ʈ]
ޔ and ي	&#1941;	y	y		[j]
ޕ	&#1942;	p	p	No Arabic equivalent	[p]
ޖ and ج	&#1943;	j	j		[d͡ʒ]
ޗ	&#1944;	ch	c	No Arabic equivalent	[t͡ʃ]
ޝ and ش	&#1949;	sh' / sh	ś	Former old Maldivian sound reintroduced via Arabic	[ʃ]
ث	&#1945;	th' / th / {s}	ṡ	Arabic sounds without Maldivian equivalent	[θ]
ﺡ	&#1946;	h' / {h}	ḥ	Arabic sounds without Maldivian equivalent	[ħ]
خ	&#1947;	kh / {h} / {k}	x	Arabic sounds without Maldivian equivalent	[x]
ذ	&#1948;	dh' / dh / {z}	ẕ	Arabic sounds without Maldivian equivalent	[ð]
ص	&#1949;	s' / {s}	ş	Arabic sounds without Maldivian equivalent	[sˤ]
ض	&#1950;	l' / {l} / {dh}	ḑ	Arabic sounds without Maldivian equivalent	[dˤ]
ط	&#1951;	t' / {t}	ţ	Arabic sounds without Maldivian equivalent	[tˤ]
ظ	&#1952;	z' / {z}	ẓ	Arabic sounds without Maldivian equivalent	[ðˤ]
ع	&#1953;	vowel + ' / '	‘	Arabic sounds without Maldivian equivalent	[ʕ]
غ	&#1954;	gh	ġ	Arabic sounds without Maldivian equivalent	[ɣ]
ق	&#1955;	q	q	Arabic sounds without Maldivian equivalent	[q]
و		w	w	Arabic sounds without Maldivian equivalent	[w]

Note: Some Arabic sounds were written as they are pronounced by Maldivians, and they are shown in curly brackets in this table.

Romanization of the Arabithaana Scripts; Vowel Diacritics, and Empty Letters
Arabithaana	HTML Unicode	Maldivian Latin	SAMT Romanization	Observations	IPA value
އަ	&#1958;	a	a		[a]
އާ	&#1959;	aa	ā		[aː]
އި	&#1960;	i	i		[i]
އީ	&#1961;	ee	ī		[iː]
އު	&#1962;	u	u		[u]
އޫ	&#1963;	oo	ū		[uː]
އެ	&#1964;	e	e		[e]
އޭ	&#1965;	ey	ē		[eː]
އޮ	&#1966;	o	o		[o]
އޯ	&#1967;	oa	ō		[oː]
އު ަ	&#1968;	au	ō̆		[oː̆]
އި ަ	&#1969;	ai	ə̄̆		[əː̆]
އް	&#1970;	-h	-k / ʾ	Geminates following consonant even if the next consonant is in another word. Only occurs as a glottal stop at the end of a sentence.	[ʔ] (occurs as allophone [ŋ] before [h] or another [ʔ])
ށް		-h	-ṣ / ʾ	Same rules as above.	[ʔ] (occurs as allophone [ŋ] as stated above)
ތް		-iy	-t	Pronunciation depends on the preceding vowel: If it is a- or ā-, it is pronounced as [ʔ] but the vowel changes into the short and long forms of [æ] respectively. If it is i-, ī-, e-, or ē-, it is [ʔ] with no vowel change. If it is any other vowel (long and short o- and u-), a short [i] sound is added to the preceding vowel (e.g. ފޮތް = [foĭʔ] "book"). This sukun-letter can also geminate consonants as stated in އް section.	[ʔ] (occurs as the allophone [ŋ])
-ނ-		n', m'	n̆, m̆	Indicates prenasalization.	[ⁿ̪d̪, ᶯɖ, ᵑɡ, ᵐb]

Being able to master and combine both Arabic and Thaana was a prerequisite to be a Katību, Mudimu or Atoll chief. The weekly Friday prayer sermon was sent by the government to every inhabited island, and it was written in both scripts, because it contained texts both in Arabic and Maldivian languages.

Even other documents of the time, like private letters, astrological writings or storybooks contained texts, in which both scripts were present, because not only quotations from Islamic religious texts, but also certain loanwords of Arabic origin (for example the local words for "special", "rule", "important", "declaration", and "service" among others) were written in the Arabic script.

== See also ==
- Romanization of Maldivian
- Dhivehi writing systems
