= Madifushi (Thaa Atoll) =

Madifushi މަޑިފުށި
- Inhabited island
- Location in Maldives
- Coordinates: 02°21′20″N 73°21′10″E
- Country: Maldives
- Administrative atoll: Thaa Atoll
- Distance to Malé: 201.97 km (125.50 mi)

Area
  - Total: 0.52 km^{2} (0.20 sq mi)

Population (2022)
  - Total: 858
  - Density: 1,600/km^{2} (4,300/sq mi)
- Time zone: UTC+05:00 (MST)

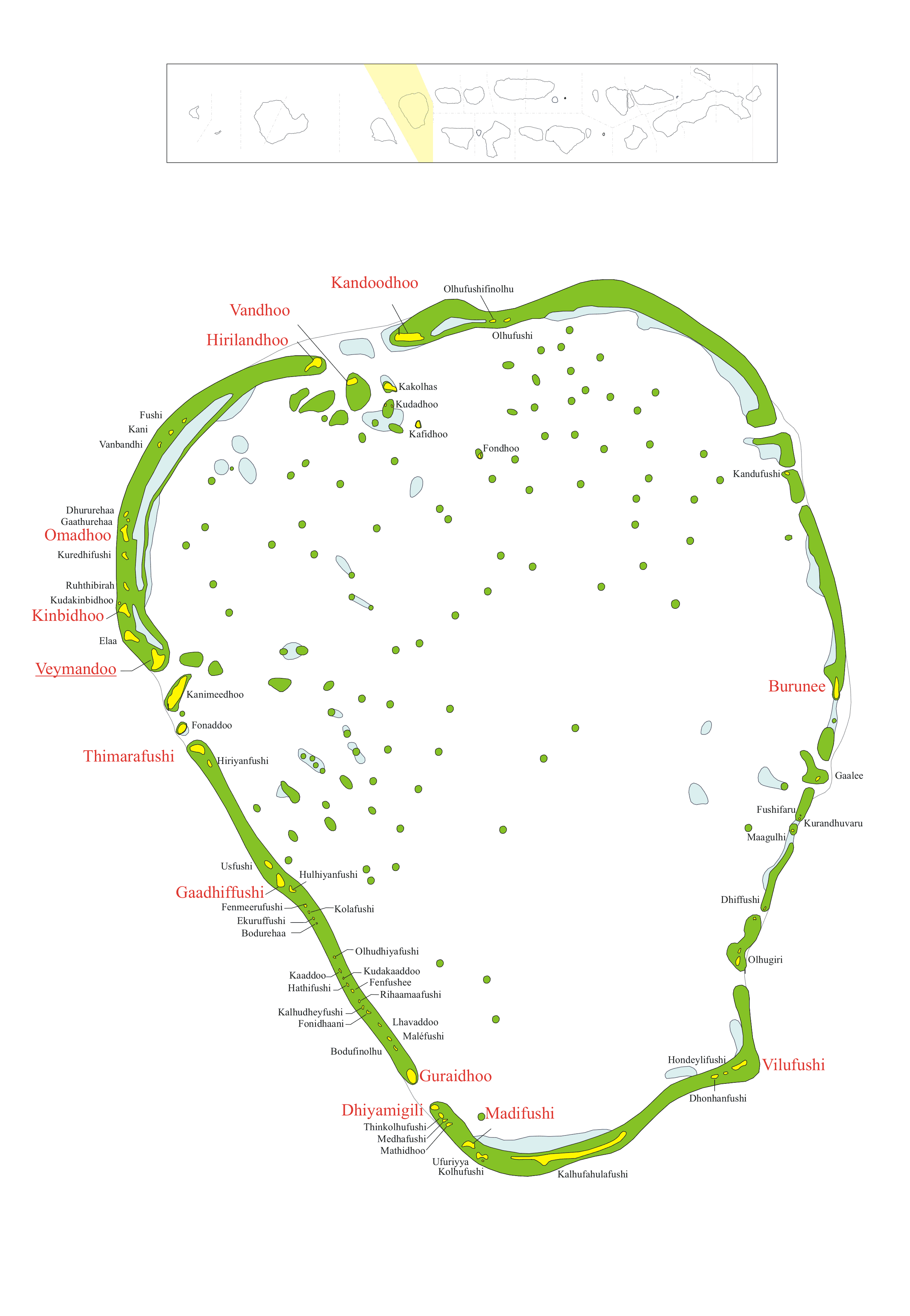
Map of Thaa Atoll

Madifushi (Dhivehi: މަޑިފުށި) is one of the inhabited islands of Thaa Atoll.

== History ==
On December 26, 2004, the 2004 tsunami left the island devastated.

== Geography ==
Madifushi is the fifth largest inhabited island by area in the atoll. It is located 26 km NNE of Thimarafushi and 201.97 km (125 mi; 109 nmi) south of the country's capital, Malé.

=== Areas ===
There are a number of unofficial areas the locals of the island uses in conversation.

==== Uthuru Avah / Fithebai Avah ====
1. Musalha Kotti

==== Dhekunu Avah / Garagui Avah ====
1. Vahbura
2. Gaburu City

== Demography ==
Historical population
Year	Pop.	±%
2006	720	—
2014	742	+3.1%
2022	858	+15.6%
2006-2022: Census populations Source:

== Economy ==
Madifushi is known for its many boats and its ship transportation business.
