= Kudahuvadhoo Kandu =

Kudahuvadhoo Kandu is the channel in between Kolhumadulu, Meemu Atoll and Dhaalu Atoll of the Maldives.
