= Shaviyani (letter) =

Second consonant of the Thaana abugida

The letter Shaviyani (ށ – formerly Rhaviyani) is the second letter of the Thaana abugida – the writing system used in the Dhivehi language of the Maldives and Minicoy Island.

The letter Shaviyani in different Thaana fonts.

== Phonological significance ==
The Shaviyani sound (ʂ) is a voiceless retroflex fricative. The same sound can be found in other languages such as Sanskrit and Russian. Wilhelm Geiger in his Maldivian Linguistic Studies states about its pronunciation:

"The sound is very difficult to describe and to imitate. It varies between r, h and s: is rather soft; and is, so far as I could observe uttered by putting the tip of the tongue in the highest part of the palate, and letting the breath escape sideways between the teeth".

== Anthropological and historic significance ==
In the earliest work on Maldivian history written by a Maldivian, (the Kitab fi Athaari Meedoo el-Qadimiyyah by Allama Ahmed Shihabuddine of Meedhoo) Shaviyani is considered a unique characteristic of the language of the first Maldivian settlers still reminiscent in the Dhivehi language today. It is said that these first settlers, the Dheyvis, came from Kalibanja (possibly Kalinga) in India several centuries before the Kingdom of Malik Aashooq and settled in Isduva island (Isdhoo) of Isduvammathi (Haddhunmathi Atoll). By the time the late-Aryan settlers came to settle the Maldives in 600 B.C., the original language of the Dheyvis had been mixed with that of later settlers the Redhins and the Kunibeens to form the Dheyvis language; but the unique Shaviyani sound had survived. The letter was described as that letter pronounced between the letter "r" and "sh". In fact the letter was called Rhaviyani until much later.

== Linguistic usage ==
In modern Dhivehi, the letter Shaviyani has two different usage.

- As a consonant in words such as ބޯށި – bōṣi (banana inflorescence), ނާށި – nāṣi (coconut shells), ދޮށި – doṣi (fishing rod) and ނެށުން – neṣuṅ (to dance) .
- Accompanying the diacritic sukun (ށް). It can be at the final position of a word where the end is abrupt and the value [ʔ].

== Other notes ==
Shaviyani is also the name designated to the administrative division of the Maldives comprising the 51 islands of the Northern Miladhunmadulhu Atoll.

== See also ==
- Maldivian language
- Dhivehi writing systems
- The Thaana alphabet
- History of the Maldives
