= Veymandoo =

Veymandoo ވޭމަންޑޫ
- Inhabited island
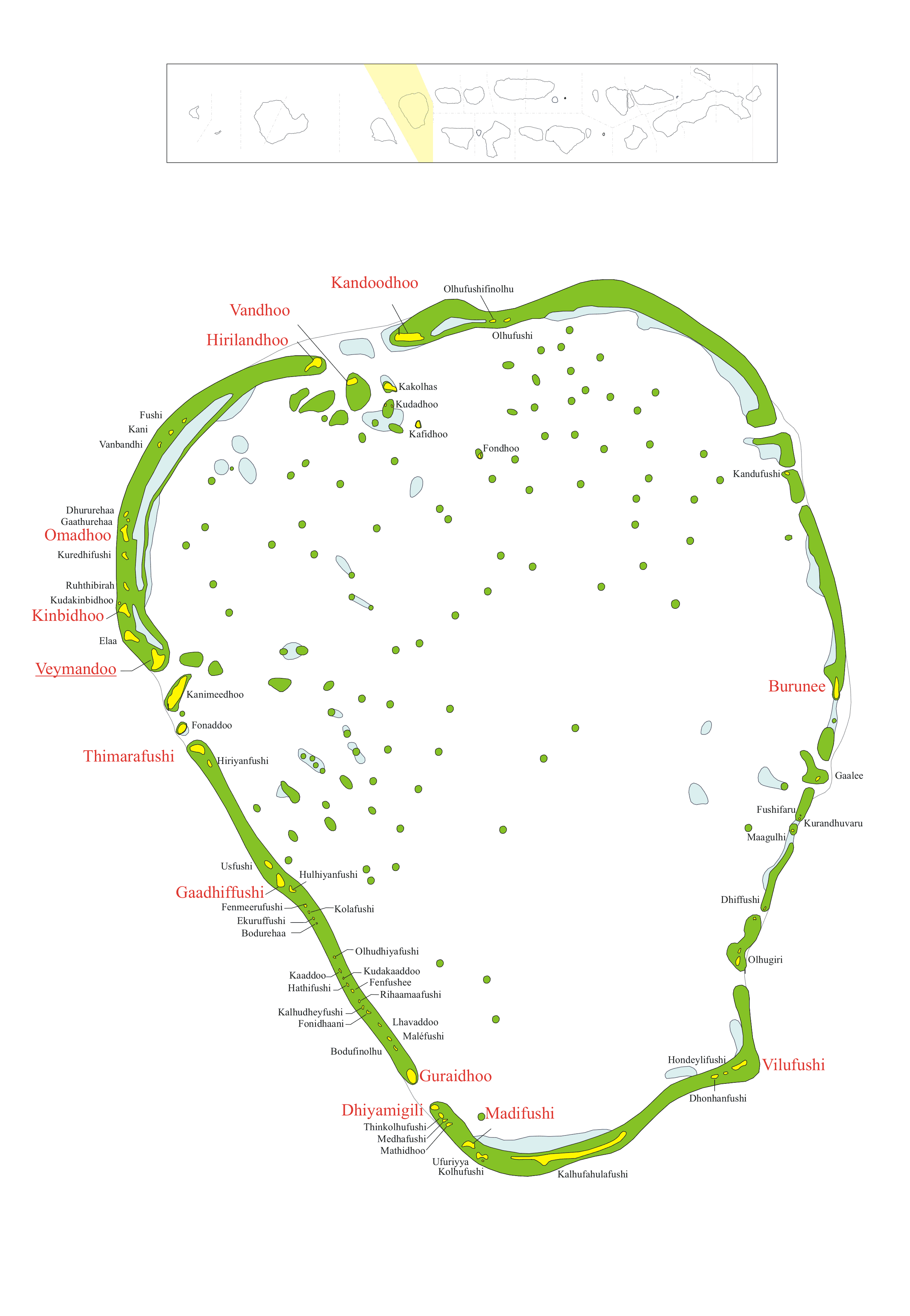
- Map of Thaa Atoll, 2006

- Location in Maldives
- Coordinates: 2°11′17.23″N 73°5′41.03″E
- Country: Maldives
- Administrative atoll: Thaa Atoll
- Distance to Malé: 224.51 km (139.50 mi)

Dimensions
  - Length: 0.930 km (0.578 mi)
  - Width: 0.930 km (0.578 mi)

Population (2022)
  - Total: 1,321
- Time zone: UTC+05:00 (MST)

Veymandoo (Dhivehi: ވޭމަންޑޫ) is the capital of Thaa Atoll in the Maldives.

== Geography ==
The island is 224.51 km (140 mi; 121 nmi) south of the country's capital, Malé.

== Demography ==
Historical population
Year	Pop.	±%
2006	928	—
2014	1,051	+13.3%
2022	1,321	+25.7%
2006-2022: Census populations Source:
