= Hirilandhoo =

Hirilandhoo ހިރިލަންދޫ
- Inhabited island
- Location in Maldives
- Coordinates: 02°16′20″N 72°55′50″E
- Country: Maldives
- Administrative atoll: Thaa Atoll
- Distance to Malé: 220.03 km (136.72 mi)

Dimensions
  - Length: 1.275 km (0.792 mi)
  - Width: 0.750 km (0.466 mi)

Population (2022)
  - Total: 1,146
- Time zone: UTC+05:00 (MST)

Hirilandhoo (Dhivehi: ހިރިލަންދޫ) is one of the inhabited islands of Thaa Atoll in the Maldives.

== History ==
The island is one of the oldest recognised in the country. A box containing a copper plate of 9th century was found in the island.

== Geography ==
The island is 220.03 km (137 mi; 119 nmi) south of the country's capital, Malé.

== Demography ==
Historical population
Year	Pop.	±%
2006	845	—
2014	953	+12.8%
2022	1,146	+20.3%
2006-2022: Census populations Source:

== Economy ==
Hirilandhoo is the most industrialized island in the atoll and region and has become a centre for boat crafting.

Fisheries is the traditional economic activity however with modern technology and boat crafting, fisheries industry had grown rapidly. Local entrepreneurs process value added products including vacuum-dried fish to be sold in domestic markets. The average male wage on the island is 350mrf each day, as of 2020.

== Culture ==
The people of the island have a history of music and dance.
