= Guraidhoo (Thaa Atoll) =

Guraidhoo ގުރައިދޫ
- Inhabited island
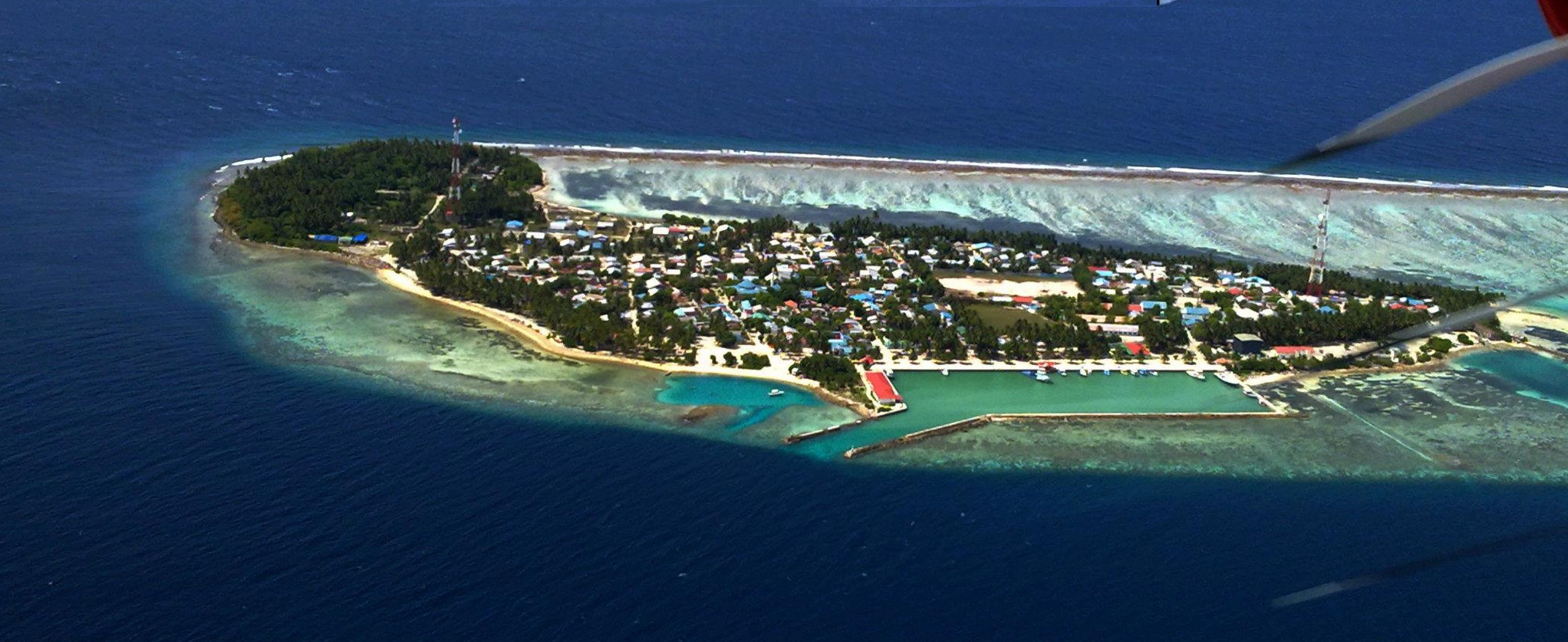
- Thaa Guraidhoo

- Location in Maldives
- Coordinates: 02°19′25″N 73°19′00″E
- Country: Maldives
- Administrative atoll: Thaa Atoll
- Distance to Malé: 205.86 km (127.92 mi)

Dimensions
  - Length: 0.775 km (0.482 mi)
  - Width: 0.375 km (0.233 mi)

Population (2022)
  - Total: 1,293
- Time zone: UTC+05:00 (MST)

Guraidhoo (Dhivehi: ގުރައިދޫ) is one of the inhabited islands of Thaa Atoll, Maldives.

== Geography ==
The island is 205.86 km (128 mi; 111 nmi) south of the country's capital, Malé. Guraidhoo is an inhabited island in the south of Male, Maldives.

Due to the rapid increase of the population the government had decided to increase the land area of this tiny island. So in 2014 the government had more than 60 ha (150 acres) of land reclaimed from the western side of the island. Due to this, the island will experience more economic development.

== Climate ==
A tropical climate throughout the year yet raining seasons come accordingly. Rainy season also comes according to the climate of Maldives. In rainy seasons roads get flooded with mud and water caused by undeveloped roads.

== History ==
There are not many records of the history available since the Maldivians started to record its history around 18th century or even later. Yet there is an old tomb which belongs to the royal family members. Similarly there was a close by island called "Kandaru" 3 mins away. This island was added to the island after the completion of land expansion program done by former President Abdulla Yameen Abdul Qayyoom. On the other hand locals in the past lived in thatched housed and there were no electricity, no internet and luxury services. The first TV was brought to the island by a local from Baadeege.

== Demography ==
Historical population
Year	Pop.	±%
2006	1,137	—
2019	2,010	+76.8%
2026	2,370	+17.9%
2022	1,293	−45.4%
2006-2022: Census populations Source:

== Economy ==
The islanders most economical activity is fishing and some agricultural activities. Also small businesses are increasing rapidly in Thaa Guraidhoo. "Guraidhoo Store" is an island council owed shop which imports most necessary goods required by the community. An industrial ice plant is located which makes it a central commercial island for fishing industry in the area. In addition Thaa Guraidhoo port is well built that makes it a destination to stop by for travellers. Recently, a new resort called Maalifushi was opened in that atoll where by Guraidhoo is the closest island to resort. This new resort has given many job opportunities for the youth of Guraidhoo.

The island can be described as a trading point to the other islands in the atoll. The infrastructure and development in the island is an example for other islands of the Maldives. The island's port is well built and it is a transit point to many boats coming and going from Male', especially for the Boats from Addu Laamu Atoll, G.dh, G.Alifu, Addu Atoll and Yaviyani Atoll.

The council of the island along with the government is working towards building an economic hub in this atoll. For this, the island had forward a perfect proposal to the government. That includes

- Establishment of an international airport.
- International transit port.
- International yacht marina.

Presently, the President of Thaa Guraidhoo Council is Thaufeeq Ali.

With the above projects, this island will be the most developed island in the Maldives.

Guraidhoo is the most developed island in the atoll. The island has a health post giving medical care for its islanders as well as the nearby island which is also managed by its women. Tha Guraidhoo women had been involving its economic, social and development work significantly, where they contribute to the island. The land reclamation project had been completed few years ago. The land use plan has been sent to the ministry of planning for approval.

== Education ==
The island has a secondary school named Thaa Atoll School. It provides education to both boys and girls from grade 1 to grade 12. It had created some successful students who are amongst national top ten achievers on the GCE O/Level Exams. It also has a pre-school giving education which was previously managed by its people especially the women. Lately pre-school was named "Guraidhoo Pre-School (GPS)" which is managed under island council.

== Healthcare ==
The island has a Health Centre managed by the Maldives. It gives some primary health care for the locals and lacks any special doctors so for urgent medical issues the locals had to travel to the capital city, Veymandoo or Laamu atoll. It also has a single pharmacy which has shortage of medicines occasionally. Yet the health center provided many economical benefits for locals since it provides jobs for locals. This area needs more improvement in the future to provide a quality and professional health care for the locals. Few Years ago a local business had also operated a clinic yet it was closed after few months of operation.

== Transport ==
The Islanders use local transport in the island. There is no public transportation within the local island. The common mode of transportation are motor bikes, bicycles, island pickups. There are two ambulances operated by the Health Centre. The island has a single car for the time being. On the other hand the locals can use public transportation services such as local ferry to travel within the atolls. Similarly there are few schedule speedboats travelling between the capital city and the island. The island has one local boat which plays an important role in transportation of goods from Malé city to the island. There is a domestic airport about 25 mins away by speedboat. Meanwhile, there is a resort called by COMO Maalifushi which has the convenience of using air taxi transfer for locals. There are about 4 fishing vessels which belong to the island. They also play an important role in the economy of the island.

== Gallery ==
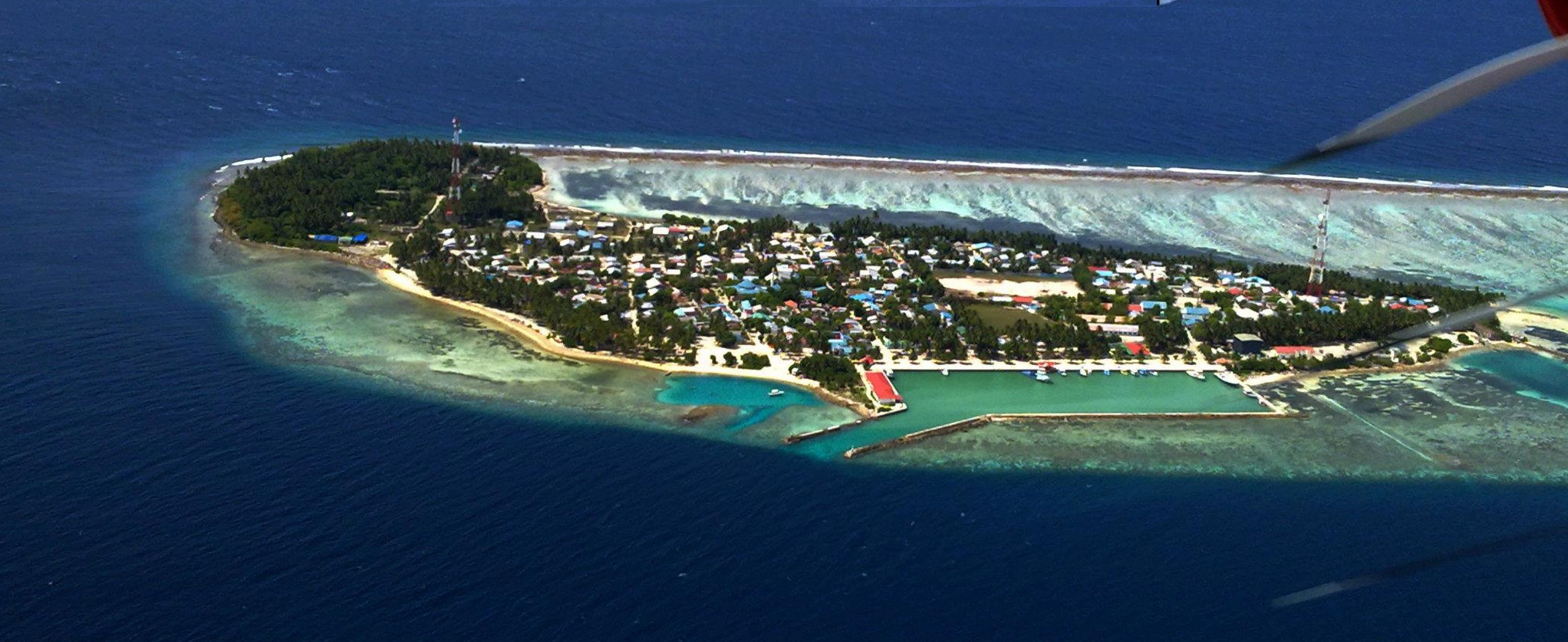
Thaa Guraidhoo

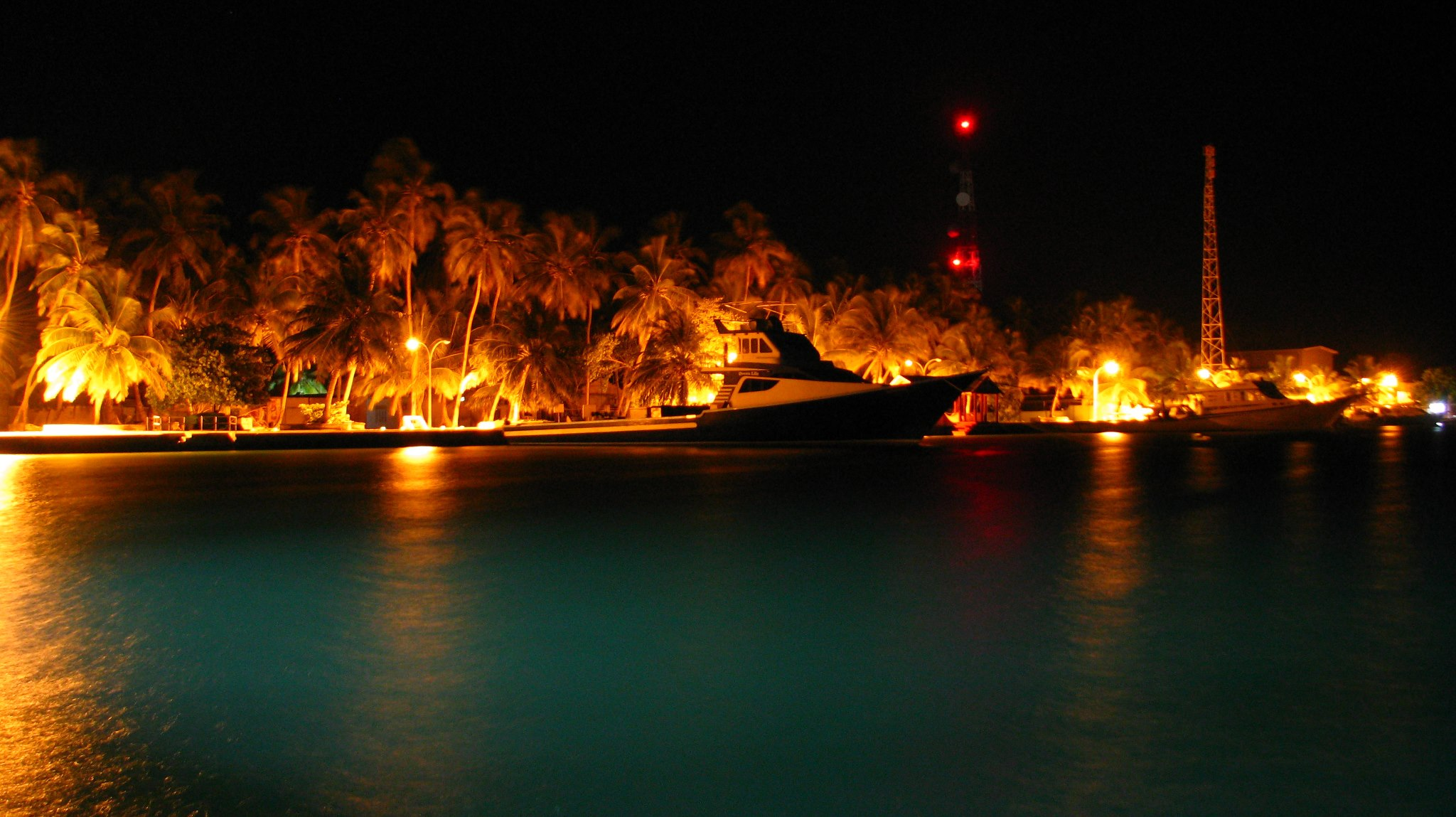
Thaa Guraidhoo Harbor
