= Thimarafushi =

Thimarafushi ތިމަރަފުށި
- Inhabited island
- Bird's-eye view of Thimarafushi

- Location in Maldives
- Coordinates: 2°12′23.51″N 73°8′37.21″E
- Country: Maldives
- Administrative atoll: Thaa Atoll
- Distance to Malé: 221.45 km (137.60 mi)

Area
  - Total: 0.62 km^{2} (0.24 sq mi)

Dimensions
  - Length: 0.750 km (0.466 mi)
  - Width: 0.330 km (0.205 mi)

Population (2022)
  - Total: 1,229
  - Density: 2,000/km^{2} (5,100/sq mi)
- Time zone: UTC+05:00 (MST)

Thimarafushi (Dhivehi: ތިމަރަފުށި) is one of the inhabited islands in Thaa Atoll of the Maldives.

== Geography ==
The island is 221.45 km (138 mi; 120 nmi) south of the country's capital, Malé. The island is geographically located in the Thaa Atoll, which is also known as the Kolhumadulu Atoll.

== Demography ==
Historical population
Year	Pop.	±%
2006	1,237	—
2014	1,102	−10.9%
2022	1,229	+11.5%
2006-2022: Census populations Source:
