= Baraveli Kandu =

Maldives water channel between four atolls

Baraveli Kandu is the channel between Noonu Atoll and Lhaviyani Atoll of the Maldives.
