= Thaa Atoll =

Coordinates: 2°22′N 73°07′E

- atoll of the Maldives
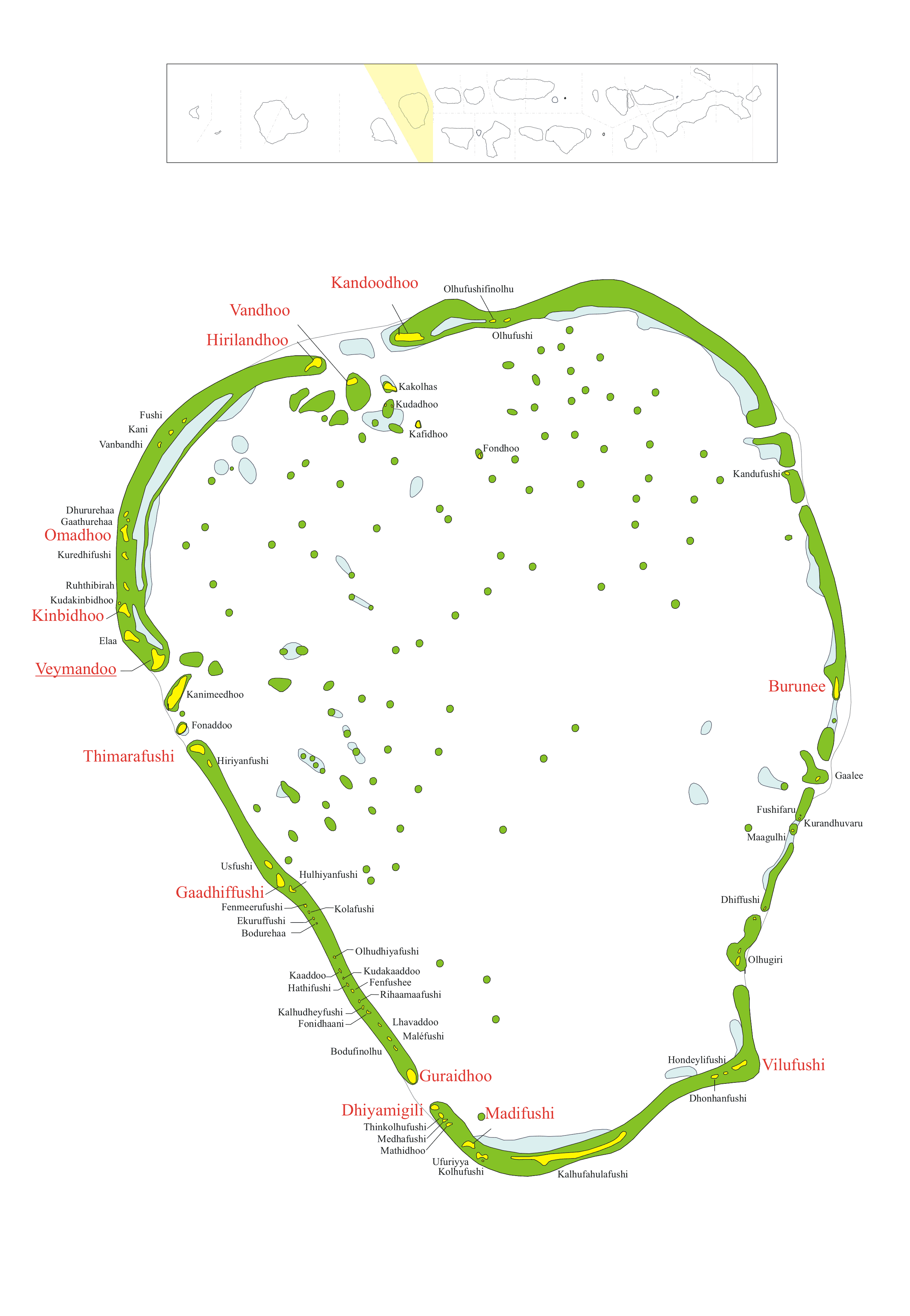

- Location of Thaa in Maldives
- Country: Maldives
- Corresponding geographic atoll(s): Kolhumadulu
- Location: 3° 34' N and 2° 11' N
- Capital: Veymandoo

Government
  - Body: Kolhumadulu Atoll Council
  - President: Rilwan Abdulla

Population
  - Total: 8,901
- Letter code: N
- Dhivehi letter code: Th (ތ)
  - Number of islands: 66
  - Inhabited islands: Burunee * Dhiyamingili * Gaadhiffushi * Guraidhoo * Hirilandhoo * Kandoodhoo * Kinbidhoo * Madifushi * Omadhoo * Thimarafushi * Vandhoo * Veymandoo * Vilufushi
  - Uninhabited islands: Bodufinolhu, Bodurehaa, Dhiffushi, Dhonanfushi, Dhururéhaa, Ekuruffushi, Elaa, Fenfushi, Fenmeerufushi, Fonaddoo, Fondhoo, Fonidhaani, Fushi, Gaalee, Gaathuréhaa, Hathifushi, Hiriyanfushi, Hodelifushi, Hulhiyanfushi, Kaaddoo, Kadufushi, Kafidhoo, Kakolhas, Kalhudheyfushi, Kalhufahalafushi, Kandaru, Kani, Kanimeedhoo, Kolhufushi, Kudadhoo, Kudagaalee, Kudakaaddoo, Kudakibidhoo, Kudaréhaa, Kurandhuvaru, Kuredhifushi, Lhavaddoo, Maagulhi, Maalefushi, Mathidhoo, Medhafushi, Olhudhiyafushi, Olhufushi, Olhufushi-finolhu, Olhugiri, Ruhththibirah, Thinkolhufushi, Ufuriyaa, Usfushi, Vanbadhi
- Resort islands(*), airports(¤) and industrial islands are also considered uninhabited.

Thaa Atoll (Dhivehi: ތ. އަތޮޅު), historically known as Kolhumadulu Atoll (Dhivehi: ކޮޅުމަޑުލު އަތޮޅު), is an administrative division of the Maldives. It corresponds to the natural atoll of the same name. The ancient name of the island was Kolhumaduva during the time of King Koimala who united all atolls of the Maldives under one kingdom for the first time.

Traditionally, Maldivians call this atoll simply Kolhumadulu, without adding the word atholhu at the end. Thaa is the code letters assigned to the atoll and is sometimes used by tourists to refer to the atoll itself.

The waters surrounding this atoll are good fishing areas and some islands house fish processing plants.

== Archaeology ==
Kolhumadulu Atoll comprises thirteen inhabitant islands. They are; Burunee, Vilufushi, Madifushi, Dhiyamigili, Guraidhoo, Kadoodhoo, Vandhoo, Hirilandhoo, Gaadhifushi, Thimarafushi, Veymandoo, Kinbidhoo, and Omadhoo. There are important Buddhist archaeological remains in the island of Kinbidhoo, including a large ruined stupa. These were explored by the late Muhammad Ismail Didi. A report on the survey was published in the book Divehi Tārīkhah Au Alikameh.

Kanimeedhoo in this atoll contains multiple remains from the Buddhist period, as well as remains of mosques, wells, bathing tanks, as well as graveyards. Elaa island between Veymandoo and Kinbidhoo is also said to have been inhabited sometime before 1258.

== Geography ==
The Atoll is the 21st Largest Atoll In the World. The shapes of the atoll closely resembles the shape of its southern neighbor Haddunmathi Atoll, except for the projection of the reef at the NE corner of Haddunmathi Atoll (Isdhū Muli). This Atoll marks the end of the east–west divide of the Maldives Atolls between Baraveli Kandu and Kudahuvadhoo Kandu.

This atoll possesses certain natural features absent in the majority of the other atolls, such as the chain of small uninhabited islands in the lagoon of Gaadhiffushi. Dhururéhaa in this atoll has an unusual type of lake not normally found in the Maldives. Kalhufahalafushi in this atoll is the longest uninhabited island of Maldives.

== 2004 Tsunami ==
Some islands in Kolhumadulu Atoll were severely affected by the 2004 Tsunami. Particularly Vilufushi, The island faced the most casualties out of all the other islands in the Maldives. The 1,900 Citizens of the island were displaced to Burunee in the same atoll. Kinbidhoo was also severely affected by the tsunami.
