= Thaana =

Writing system of the Maldivian language

Thaana ތާނަ
- Script type: Abjad/Abugida; With no inherent vowel
- Period: 17th century — present
- Direction: Right-to-left script
- Languages: Maldivian language

Related scripts
- Parent systems: Egyptian hieroglyphs: Proto-Sinaitic script; Phoenician alphabet; Aramaic alphabet; Nabataean script; Partially from Arabic Alphabet and Hindu-Arabic numerals; Thaana

ISO 15924
- ISO 15924: Thaa (170), Thaana

Unicode
- Unicode alias: Thaana
- Unicode range: U+0780–U+07BF

Thaana, Tãna, Taana or Tāna ( ތާނަ ) is the writing system of the Maldivian language spoken in the Maldives. Thaana has characteristics of both an abugida (diacritics, vowel-killer strokes) and a true alphabet (all vowels are written), with consonants derived from indigenous and Arabic numerals, and vowels derived from the vowel diacritics of the Arabic abjad. Maldivian orthography in Thaana is largely phonemic.

== Name ==
H. C. P. Bell used the spelling Tāna, as the initial consonant is unaspirated. The spelling Thaana was adopted in the mid-1970s, when the government of the Maldives embarked on a short period of Romanization; /t/ was transcribed ⟨th⟩, as ⟨t⟩ was used for the voiceless retroflex plosive [ʈ].

== History ==
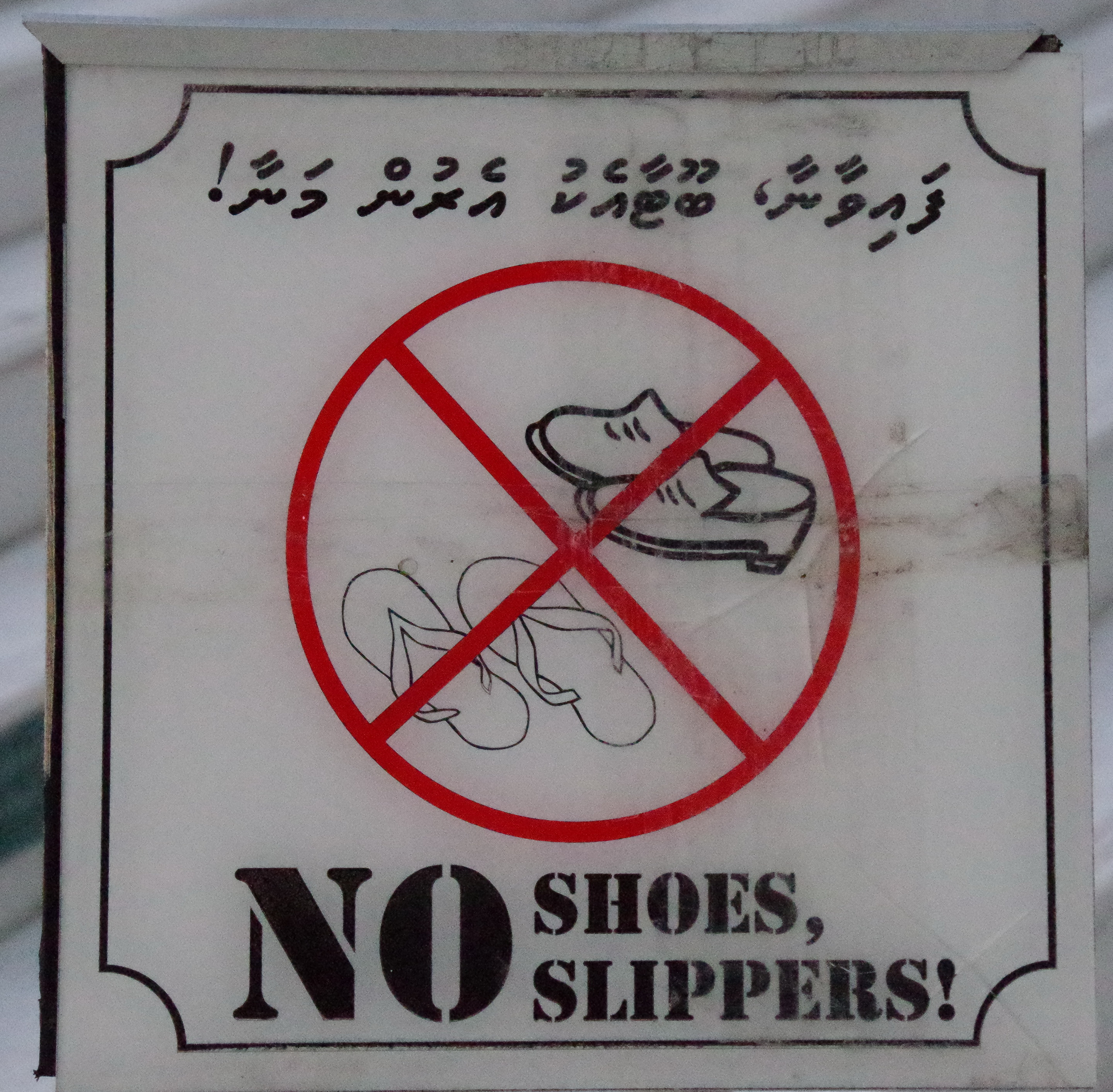
Sign at a mosque in Malé: the Thaana script reads Faivānā, būṭāeku erun manā!.

The Thaana script first appeared in Maldivian inscriptions towards the beginning of the fifteenth century, during the reign of Golāvahī Nāṣiruddīn (Sultan Nasir al-Din al-Gulavihi, 1409–1411), in an early form known as Gabulhi (“incomplete”) Thaana. This early form was written in scripta continua, without spaces between words. The earliest known surviving Thaana inscription, dating to AD 1479, was discovered on a gravestone. The oldest written sample of the Thaana script is found in the island of Kanditheemu in Northern Miladhunmadulu Atoll. It is inscribed on the door posts of the main Hukuru Miskiy (Friday mosque) of the island and dates back to 1599 and 1611 when the roof of the building was built and then renewed during the reigns of Ibrahim Kalaafaan (Sultan Ibrahim III) and Hussain Faamuladeyri Kilege (Sultan Hussain II) respectively.

The modern thaana script was invented sometime before 1705, possibly as early as the 16th century. It was intended to allow for usage with Arabic characters, while also incorporating vowel notations. Maldivian oral tradition holds that Sultan Muhammad Thakurufaanu brought the script from the north; however, there is no evidence to support this.

The first nine letters (h ṣ n r b ḷ k ʔ v) are derived from the Arabic numerals, whereas the next nine (m f d t l g ṇ s ḍ) were the local Indic numerals. (See Hindu–Arabic numerals.) The remaining letters for loanwords (z ṭ y p j c ñ) and Arabic transliteration (h̤ ḵ ž ʕ ġ w ẕ t̤ ẓ s̱ q s̤ ż ś) are derived from phonetically similar native consonants by means of diacritics (like nuqta), with the exception of yaa, which is of unknown origin.

The order of the Thaana alphabet (ha, shaviyani, noonu, raa, baa, etc.) does not follow the order of other Indic scripts or of the Arabic script. There is no apparent logic to the order; this has been interpreted as suggesting that the script was scrambled to keep it secret from average islanders. The script was originally used to write magical (fanḍita) incantations and Quranic quotations, written from right to left. Maldivian learned men saw the advantages of writing in this simplified hidden script, and Thaana was gradually adopted for everyday use.

Towards the mid-1970s, during President Ibrahim Nasir's administration, teleprinters were introduced by the Maldivian government into the local administration. The new telex equipment was viewed as a great progress, but Thaana was deemed to be an obstacle because messages on the machines could only be written in the Latin script. Following this, in 1976, the Maldivian government approved and implemented an official Latin transliteration. Booklets detailing the new transliteration were distributed to all Atoll and Island Offices, as well as schools and merchant liners.

The Thaana script was reinstated by President Maumoon Abdul Gayoom shortly after he took power in 1978, although the Latin transcription of 1976 continues to be widely used.

== Characteristics ==
Thaana, like Arabic, is written right to left. It indicates vowels with diacritic marks derived from Arabic. Each letter must carry either a vowel or a sukun (which indicates "no vowel"). The only exception to this rule is nūnu which, when written without a diacritic, indicates prenasalization of a following stop.

For a sample text, see the article on Qaumee salaam, the Maldives' national anthem.

Even though it is not part of the alphabet, the Arabic ligature for Allah (ﷲ) is used for writing names in Thaana; for example އަބްދުﷲ represents Abdullah, but is written as Abdu+Allah.

=== Consonants ===
The letter alifu (އ) is used for three different purposes other than acting as a normal consonant: it can act as a carrier for a vowel in the second part of a diphthong (if there is a preceding consonant with a vowel); when it carries a sukun, it indicates gemination (lengthening) of the following consonant (even if the consonant is at the beginning of another word); and if alifu+sukun occurs at the end of a word, it indicates that the word ends in a glottal stop. Gemination of nasal consonants, however, is indicated by nūnu+sukun preceding the nasal to be geminated. Originally, each letter had the name "consonant+a+viyani". The suffix -viyani originated from the word viyana which came from Sanskrit व्यञ्जन vyáñjana. For example, haa was originally called haviyani. The names of consonants which had equivalent sounds in Arabic were changed to the Arabic names for the sounds (excepting gaafu, which is a Persian name).

Consonants
Derived from Eastern Arabic digits 1–9	haa ހ h IPA: [h]	shaviyani ށ ṣ IPA: [ʂ]	noonu ނ n IPA: [n]	raa ރ r IPA: [ɾ]	baa ބ b IPA: [b]	lhaviyani ޅ ḷ IPA: [ɭ]	kaafu ކ k IPA: [k]	alifu އ IPA: [ʔ] (Note: A null-consonant used as a carrier for a vowel.)	vaavu ވ v IPA: [ʋ]
Derived from Dhives akuru digits 1–9	meemu މ m IPA: [m]	faafu ފ f IPA: [f]	dhaalu ދ d IPA: [d̪]	thaa ތ t IPA: [t̪]	laamu ލ l IPA: [l]	gaafu ގ g IPA: [ɡ]	ṇaviyani ޱ ṇ IPA: [ɳ] (Note: This letter order is slightly anachronistic. The letter ⟨ޱ⟩, ṇaviyani, was abolished from Maldivian official documents around 1953 and it was replaced with ⟨ޏ⟩, gnaviyani, making gnaviyani the sixteenth letter of the alphabet.)	seenu ސ s IPA: [s̺]	daviyani ޑ ḍ IPA: [ɖ]
Derived from other Thaana letters	zaviyani ޒ z IPA: [z̺] from ރ	taviyani ޓ ṭ IPA: [ʈ] from ބ	yaa ޔ y IPA: [j] possibly from ށ	paviyani ޕ p IPA: [p] from ފ	javiyani ޖ j IPA: [dʒ] from ދ	chaviyani ޗ c IPA: [tʃ] from ތ	gnaviyani ޏ ñ IPA: [ɲ] from ނ		

Digit	1	2	3	4	5	6	7	8	9
Eastern Arabic	١	٢	٣	٤۴	٥۵	٦۶	٧	٨	٩
Thaana	ހ	ށޔ	ނޏ	ރޒ	ބޓ	ޅ	ކ	އ	ވ
Dhives Akuru	𑥑	𑥒	𑥓	𑥔	𑥕	𑥖	𑥗	𑥘	𑥙
Thaana	މ	ފޕ	ދޖ	ތޗ	ލ	ގ	ޱ	ސ	ޑ

==== Naviyani ====
Naviyani (ޱ) represents the voiced retroflex nasal "ṇ" ([ɳ]) common to many Indic languages. This letter was abolished from Maldivian official documents around 1953.

The letter's former position in the Maldivian alphabet was the sixteenth, between Gaafu and Seenu, instead of Gnaviyani (ޏ). The former position of Gnaviyani (ޏ) was 22nd. It is still seen in reprints of old books like the Bodu Tarutheebu, and it is used by the people of Addu Atoll and Fuvahmulah when writing songs or poetry in their dialects as the sound is still present in their spoken dialects.

==== Additional letters ====
These additional letters (thikijehi thaana) were added to the Thaana alphabet by adding a nukuthaa (dot) to existing letters, to allow for transliteration of Arabic loanwords (except for ޜ že), as previously Arabic loanwords were written using the Arabic script. Their usage is inconsistent, and becoming less frequent as the spelling changes to reflect pronunciation by Maldivians, rather than the original Arabic pronunciation, as the words get absorbed into the Maldivian language.

Thikijehi thaana
h̤ā, ح ޙ IPA: [ħ]	k͟hā, خ ޚ IPA: [x]	že, ژ ޜ IPA: [ʒ]	‘ainu, ع ޢ IPA: [ʕ]	ġainu, غ ޣ IPA: [ɣ]	wāvu, و ޥ IPA: [w]	ẕālu, ذ ޛ IPA: [ð]
t̤ā, ط ޠ IPA: [tˤ]	ẓā, ظ ޡ IPA: [ðˤ]	s̱ā, ث ޘ IPA: [θ]	qāfu, ق ޤ IPA: [q]	s̤ādu, ص ޞ IPA: [sˤ]	żādu, ض ޟ IPA: [dˤ]	śīnu, ش ޝ IPA: [ʃ]

=== Vowels ===
There are five vowel strokes or diacritical signs (Dhivehi: ފިލި, romanized: fili) for short vowels (a, i, u, e, o). The signs abafili, ibifili, ubufil and sukun (which indicates the absence of a vowel after the consonant, and is therefore used in consonant clusters) are derived from the Arabic vowel signs fatḥah, kasrah, ḍammah and sukūn. The ebefili looks similar to and is most likely modelled on the Urdu baṛī ye. Long vowels (aa, ee, oo, ey and oa) are denoted by double fili, with the exception of oa, which is a modification of the short obofili.

Vowels displayed with an alifu as a carrier
abafili އަ a IPA: [a]	ābāfili އާ ā IPA: [aː]	ibifili އި i IPA: [i]	ībīfili އީ ī IPA: [iː]	ubufili އު u IPA: [u]	ūbūfili އޫ ū IPA: [uː]	ebefili އެ e IPA: [e]	ēbēfili އޭ ē IPA: [eː]	obofili އޮ o IPA: [o]	ōbōfili އޯ ō IPA: [oː]	sukun އް

== Unicode ==
Thaana was added to the Unicode Standard in September 1999 with the release of version 3.0.

The Unicode block for Thaana is U+0780–U+07BF:

Thaana^{[1]}^{[2]} Official Unicode Consortium code chart (PDF)
	0	1	2	3	4	5	6	7	8	9	A	B	C	D	E	F
U+078x	ހ	ށ	ނ	ރ	ބ	ޅ	ކ	އ	ވ	މ	ފ	ދ	ތ	ލ	ގ	ޏ
U+079x	ސ	ޑ	ޒ	ޓ	ޔ	ޕ	ޖ	ޗ	ޘ	ޙ	ޚ	ޛ	ޜ	ޝ	ޞ	ޟ
U+07Ax	ޠ	ޡ	ޢ	ޣ	ޤ	ޥ	ަ	ާ	ި	ީ	ު	ޫ	ެ	ޭ	ޮ	ޯ
U+07Bx	ް	ޱ														
Notes 1.As of Unicode version 18.0 2.Grey areas indicate non-assigned code points

== See also ==
- Maldivian writing systems

== Literature ==
- Bell, H. C. P. (2002) [1940]. The Maldive islands: Monograph on the History, Archaeology and Epigraphy. Malé: Novelty Printers Publishers. ISBN 9789991530512.
- Bell, H. C. P. (2004) [1883, Frank Luker]. The Maldive Islands: An account of the physical features, History, Inhabitants, Productions and Trade. New Delhi: Asian Educational services. ISBN 81-206-1222-1. OCLC 85765246.
- Bell, H. C. P. Excerpta Maldiviana. Reprint 1922-1935 edition New Delhi 1998.
- Divehi Bahuge Qawaaaid. Vols 1 to 5. Ministry of Education. Malé 1978.
- Divehīnge Tarika. Divehīnge Bas. Divehibahāi Tārikhah Khidumaykurā Qaumī Majlis. Malé 2000.
- Geiger, Wilhelm (1996) [1919]. Maldivian Linguistic Studies. New Delhi: Asian Educational Services. ISBN 9788120612013.
- Romero-Frias, Xavier (2003). The Maldive Islanders, A Study of the Popular Culture of an Ancient Ocean Kingdom (3rd rev. ed.). Barcelona: Nova Ethnographia Indica. ISBN 84-7254-801-5. OCLC 55679148.
