= Maldivian language =

Indo-Aryan language native to the Maldives

Maldivian
- Divehi/ Dhivehi
- ދިވެހި, Divehi
- The word "Divehi" in the Thaana script
- Pronunciation: [d̪iʋehi]
- Native to: Maldives; India (Minicoy island)
- Ethnicity: Maldivians
- Native speakers: 504,829 (2022)
- Language family: Indo-European: Indo-Iranian; Indo-Aryan; Southern; Sinhalese–Maldivian; Maldivian
- Early forms: Elu: Old Dhivehi
- Dialects: See § Dialects
- Writing system: Thaana (official); Unofficial; Latin (Maldivian alphabet); Historical; Dhives Akuru (until the 19th century); Eveyla Akuru (ancient)
- Signed forms: Signed Maldivian

Official status
- Official language in: Maldives
- Regulated by: Dhivehi Language Academy

Language codes
- ISO 639-1: dv
- ISO 639-2: div
- ISO 639-3: div
- Glottolog: dhiv1236
- IETF: dv-MV
- Orthographic projection of the Maldives

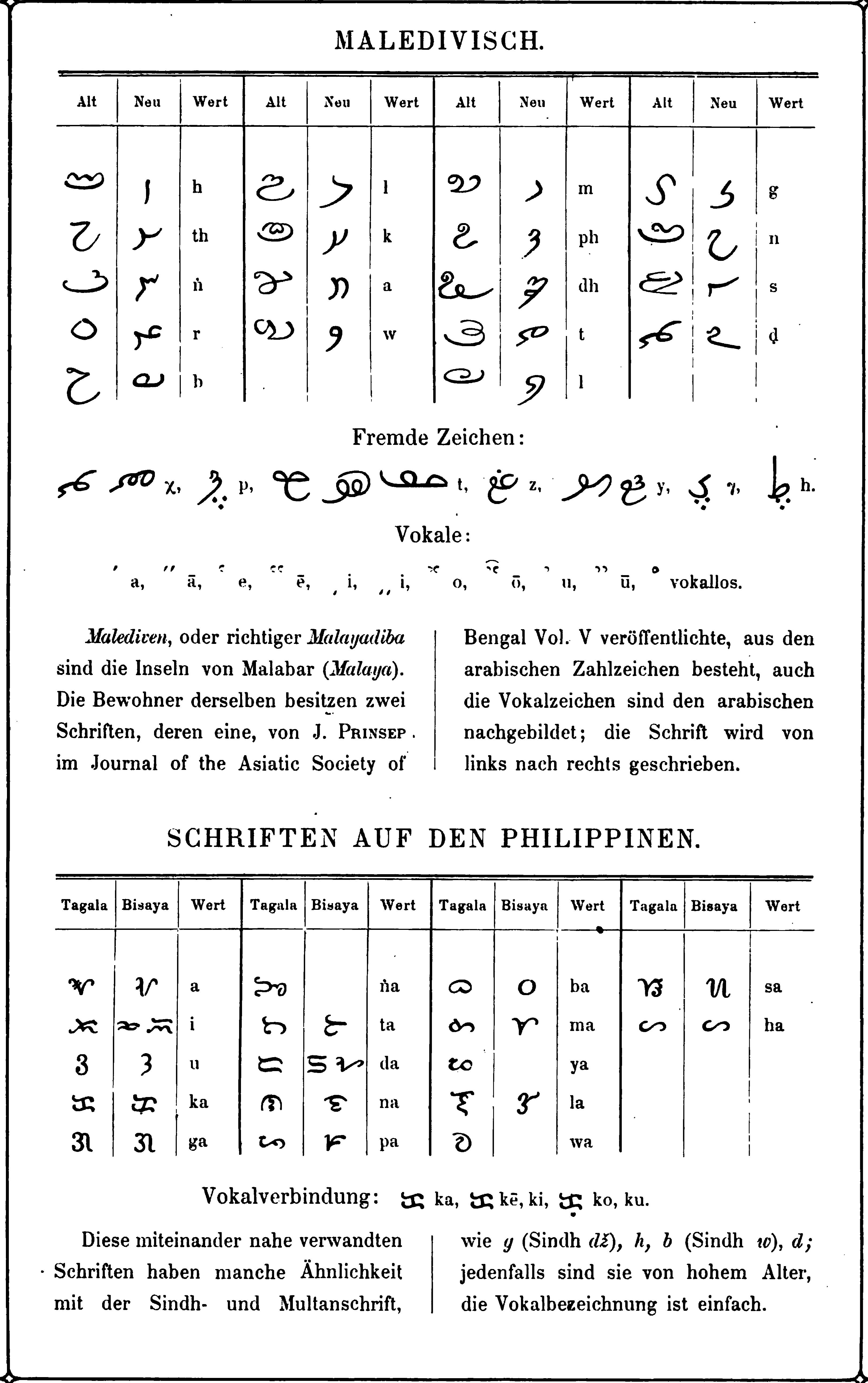
Maldivian in Carl Faulmann's Das Buch der Schrift, 1880

Maldivian (Note: /mɔːlˈdɪviən/), also known by its endonym Divehi (ދިވެހި, Divehi, [d̪iʋehi]; sometimes spelled as Dhivehi), is an Indo-Aryan language belonging to the Indo-Iranian branch of the Indo-European language family, primarily spoken by the Maldivian people native to the South Asian archipelagic state of the Maldives; as well as the neighbouring Minicoy Island within Lakshadweep, a union territory of India.

The ethnic endonym for the language, Divehi, is occasionally found in English as Dhivehi (spelled according to the locally used Malé Latin for the romanisation of the Maldivian language), which is the official spelling as well as the common usage in the Maldives. Maldivian is written in Thaana script.

The Maldivian language has four notable dialects. The standard dialect is that of the capital city of Malé. The greatest dialectal variation exists in the southern atolls of Huvadhu, Addu and Fuvahmulah. Each of these atolls has its own distinct dialect often thought to be interconnected with each other while being widely different from the dialect spoken in the northern atolls. The southern dialects are so distinct that those only speaking northern dialects cannot understand them.

Maldivian is a descendant of Elu Prakrit and is closely related to Sinhala, but not mutually intelligible with it. Many languages have influenced the development of Maldivian through the ages. They include Malayalam, Arabic, Hindustani, Persian, Tamil, French, Portuguese, and English. The English words atoll (a ring of coral islands or reefs) and dhoni (a vessel for inter-atoll navigation) are anglicised forms of the Maldivian words atoḷu and dōni. Before European colonisation of the Southern Hemisphere, it was the southernmost Indo-European language.

== Etymology ==
The origin of the word "Divehi" is from older divu-vesi, meaning "island dwelling". Divu (from Sanskrit द्वीप dvīpa, 'island') later became ދޫ dū, which is currently present in many names of Maldivian islands, such as Hanimādū, Mīdū, and Dāndū. Vesi came from the Sanskrit suffix -वासिन् -vāsin and later became ވެހި vehi. ބަސް bas (from Sanskrit भाषा bhāṣā) means "language", so ދިވެހިބަސް dhivehi bas means "islanders' language".

Wilhelm Geiger, a German linguist who undertook the first research on Maldivian linguistics in the early 20th century, also called the language Divehi. An h was added to the name of the language— "Dhivehi"— in 1976, when the semi-official transliteration called Malé Latin was developed. Today the spelling with Dh has common and semi-official usage in the Maldives.

== Origin ==
Maldivian is an Indo-Aryan language closely related to the Sinhala language of Sri Lanka. Maldivian represents the southernmost Indo-Aryan language, as well as the southernmost Indo-European language prior to European colonisation. Maldivian and Sinhalese together constitute a subgroup within the modern Indo-Aryan languages, called Insular Indo-Aryan. However, they are not mutually intelligible.

Maldivian and Sinhala are descended from the Elu Prakrit of ancient and medieval Sri Lanka. These Prakrits were originally derived from Old Indo-Aryan vernaculars related to Vedic Sanskrit.

Whereas formerly Maldivian was thought to be a descendant of Sinhala, in 1969 Sinhalese philologist M. W. S. de Silva for the first time proposed that Maldivian and Sinhalese had branched off from a common mother language.

The following are some phonological features shared by Sinhala, or unique to Maldivian:

- Loss of aspiration in stop consonants (Sanskrit khasa → Maldivian kah, Sinhala kas, both "itch").
- Fortition of initial y- → j- → d-, not shared by Sinhala (yaṣṭi → Maldivian doṣi, Sinhala yæṭi, both "fishing rod").
- Development of prenasalized consonants from nasal and voiced stop clusters (ambā → Maldivian and Sinhala am̆bi, both "wife").
- Spirantisation of p → f (panca → Maldivian fas, Sinhala paha, both "five").
- Assibilation of ṭ → ṣ except when geminated (kaṇṭaka → Maldivian kaṣi, Sinhala kaṭuva, both "thorn").
- Backing of vowels e and i into o and u before retroflex consonants (older Maldivian ateḷu → atoḷu "atoll")
- Loss of contrast between n and ṇ (except in the Addu dialect, e.g. fani "juice" : faṇi "worm" is rendered homophonous elsewhere), but not l and ḷ (ali "light" : aḷi "ash").
- L-vocalisation occurred in Standard Maldivian, Addu, and Minicoy (mal → mau → mā "flower", tel → teu → teyo "oil").

== History ==
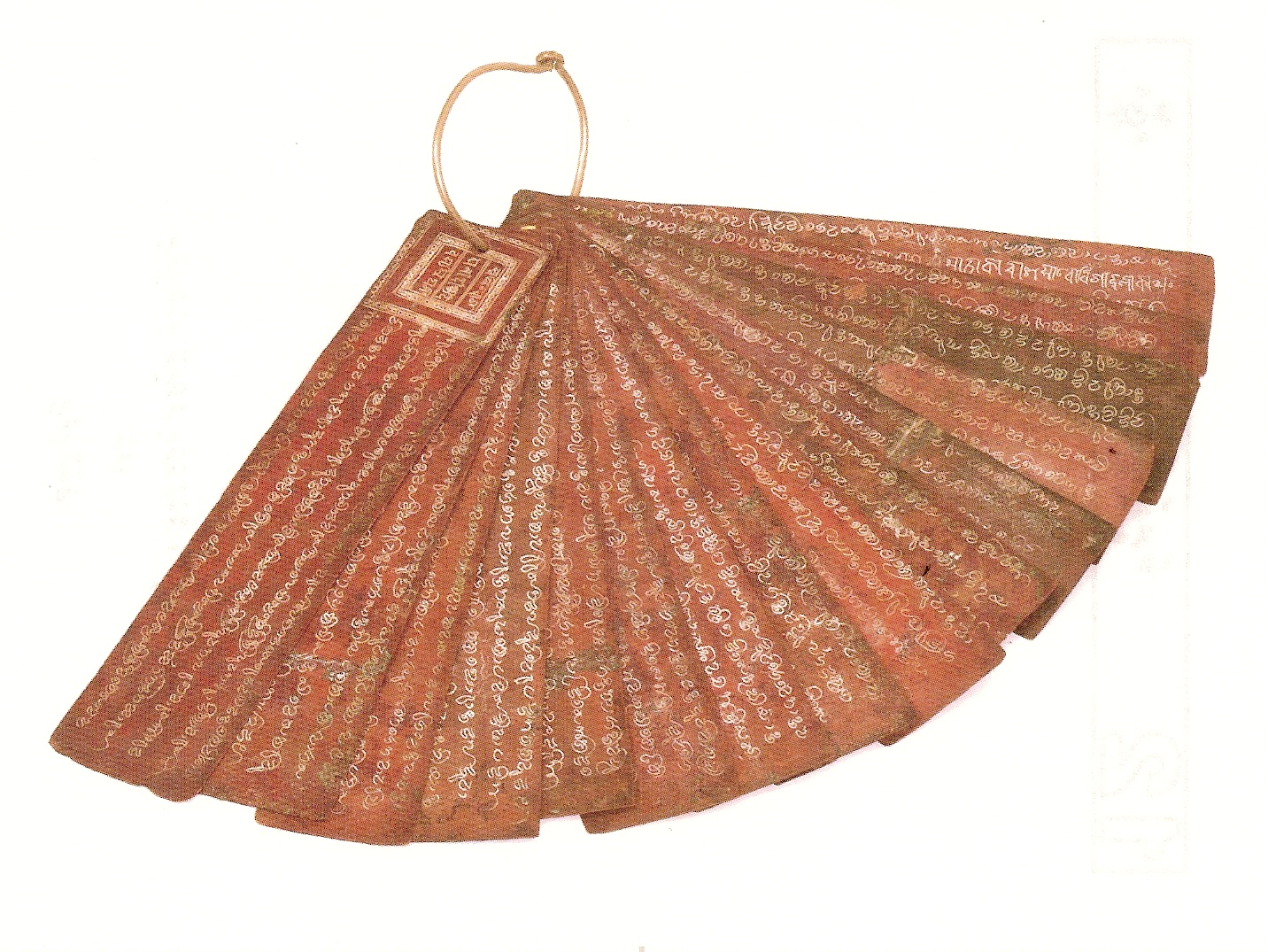
12th-century lōmāfānu, copper plates on which early Maldivian sultans wrote orders and grants

The earliest official writings were on the lōmāfānu (copper-plate grants) of the 12th and 13th centuries. Earlier inscriptions on coral stone have also been found. The oldest inscription found to date is an inscription on a coral stone, which is estimated to be from around the 6th-8th centuries.

Maldivian is an Indo-Aryan language of the Sinhalese-Maldivian subfamily. It developed in relative isolation from other languages until the 12th century. Since the 16th century, Maldivian has been written in a unique script called Thaana which is written from right to left, like Arabic (with which it shares several common diacritics for vowel sounds).

The foundation of the historical linguistic analysis of both Maldivian and Sinhalese was laid by Wilhelm Geiger (1856–1943). In Geiger's comparative study of Maldivian and Sinhalese, he assumes that Maldivian is a dialectal offspring of Sinhalese and therefore is a "daughter language" of Sinhalese. However, the material he collected was not sufficient to judge the "degree of relationship" of Maldivian and Sinhalese.

Geiger concludes that Maldivian must have split from Sinhalese not earlier than the 10th century CE. However, there is nothing in the history of these islands or Sinhalese chronicles, even in legendary form, that alludes to a migration of Sinhalese people which would result in such a connection. Maldives is completely absent from the pre-12th century records of Sri Lanka.

A rare Maliku Thaana primer written in the Maliku dialect, published by Lakshadweep's administration during the time of Rajiv Gandhi's rule, was reprinted by Spanish researcher Xavier Romero Frías in 2003.

The Dhivehi Language Day is celebrated in the Maldives on 14 April, the birthday of the writer Husain Salahuddin.

== Geographic distribution ==
Maldivian is spoken in the Maldives and a variation of it in Minicoy.

=== Official status ===
Maldivian is the official language of the Maldives and a semi-official language in the union territory of Lakshadweep, India.

=== Dialects ===
The Maldivian language has multiple dialects due to the wide distribution of the islands, causing differences in pronunciation and vocabulary to develop during the centuries. The most divergent dialects of the language are to be found in the southern atolls, namely Huvadhu, Fuvahmulah and Addu. The other variants show less difference to the official dialect, including the dialects spoken in a few islands in Kolhumadulu Atoll and the now obsolete dialect once spoken in Giraavaru, which are hardly recognised and known.

- Malé dialect is the mainstream Maldivian dialect (bahuruva) and is based on the dialect spoken in the capital of the Maldives, Malé.
- Haddhunmathee dialect spoken in Haddhunmathi Atoll.
- Maliku dialect (Mahl) spoken in Minicoy (Maliku) in union territory of Lakshadweep, India. The dialect spoken in Minicoy has fewer differences from the standard Maldivian than other dialects. It has some archaic forms of words and Malayalam loanwords.
- Mulaku dialect is a dialect of Maldivian spoken by the people of Fuvahmulah. Mulaku dialect has word-final 'l' (laamu sukun ލް), which is absent from the other dialects of Maldivian. Another characteristic is the 'o' sound at the end of words, instead of the final 'u' common in all other forms of Maldivian; e.g. fanno instead of fannu. Regarding pronunciation, the retroflex 'ṣ' (IPA [ʂ]), has a [ɽ̊~ɽ̊r̥] sound in the Mulaku dialect and was once pronounced that way in official Maldivian. One of the most unusual features of Mulaku dialect is that, unlike other dialects, it distinguishes gender. Also, there are many remarkable differences in the dialect in place of the sukun system as well as the vowel or diacritical system following a distinctive set of rules. The Mulaku dialect also has nasal vowels, which are unique only to this dialect.
- Huvadhu dialect, spoken by the inhabitants of the large atoll of Huvadhu, is another distinctive form of Maldivian. Because of the isolation from the Northern Atolls, and the capital of Malé, Huvadhu dialect makes more use of the retroflex /ʈ/ than other variants. Huvadhu dialect also retains old Sinhalese words and is sometimes considered to be linguistically closer to Sinhalese than the other dialects of Maldivian. The Huvadhu dialect can be separated into two subdialects, the eastern and western Huvadhu dialects.
- Addu dialect is also quite different from the official form of Maldivian and has some affinities with Mulaku dialect. In the past, Addu Atoll being a centre of education, the islanders from the three atolls of the south who acquired education there used Addu dialect as their lingua franca. Hence, when for example one of these islanders of any of the Huvadhu islands met with someone from Fuvahmulah, they would use Addu dialect to talk to each other. Addu dialect is the most widespread of the dialects of Maldivian. However, the secessionist government of the Suvadives (1959–1963) used Malé dialect in its official correspondence.
- Madifushi dialect is the lesser known dialect in the Madifushi island of Kolhumadulu and has some similarities with Huvadhu dialect. Word-final 'a' is often replaced with 'e' or 'o', and some final consonants also differ.
- Kudahuvadhoo dialect is also a lesser known dialect spoken in Kudahuvadhoo island. The dialect has less differences compared to other dialects, however some pronouns and words differ, and the suffix "ne" is replaced with "ɭe" (E.g. Nufennaane is pronounced as Nufennaaɭe). This dialect is also spoken in Hirilandhoo and a few other islands of Kolhumadulu.
- Kulhudhuffushi dialect is a dialect spoken in Kulhudhuffushi city. The dialect has new words and is a lot more unique.
- Naifaru dialect is spoken in Naifaru island of Lhaviyani Atoll. The dialect has a lot more differences, mainly with the sound "ai" being replaced with "ey". (E.g. "Sai" is "Sey", "Naifaru" is "Neyfaru".
- Giraavaru dialect is now an almost extinct dialect one spoken on the island of Giraavaru. The dialect is quite unusual for islands near Malé. The with the Voiced retroflex lateral approximant (ɭ) is replaced by the voiced alveolar tap (r)

The letter Ṇaviyani (ޱ), which represented the retroflex n sound common to many Indic languages (Gujarati, Hindi, etc.), was abolished from official documents in by Muhammad Amin in 1950. Ṇaviyani's former position in the Thaana alphabet, between the letters Gaafu and Seenu, is today occupied by the palatal nasal Ñaviyani (ޏ). It is still seen in reprints of traditional old books like the Boḍu Tarutību and official documents like the Rādavaḷi. It is also used by people of southern atolls when writing songs or poetry in their language variant.

According to Sonja Fritz, "the dialects of Maldivian represent different diachronial stages in the development of the language. Especially in the field of morphology, the amount of archaic features steadily increase from the north to the south. Within the three southernmost atolls (of the Maldives), the dialect of the Addu islands which form the southern tip of the whole archipelago is characterized by the highest degree of archaicity".

However, the Huvadhu Atoll dialect is characterised by the highest degree of archaicity. From Huvadhu Atoll the archaic features decrease toward the south and north.

Fritz also adds that "the different classes of verb conjugation and nominal inflection are best preserved there, morphological simplifications and, as a consequence increasing from atoll to atoll towards north (in the Maldives)".

== Writing system ==
The Maldivian language has had its own script since very ancient times, most likely over two millennia, when Maldivian Buddhist monks translated and copied the Buddhist scriptures. It used to be written in the earlier form (Evēla) of the Dhives Akuru ("Maldivian letters") which are written from left to right. Dhives Akuru were used in all of the islands between the conversion to Islam and until the 18th century. These ancient Maldivian letters were also used in official correspondence with Addu Atoll until the early 20th century. Perhaps they were used in some isolated islands and rural communities until the 1960s, but the last remaining native user died in the 1990s. Today Maldivians rarely learn the Dhives Akuru alphabet, for Arabic is favoured as the second script.

Maldivian is now written using a different script, called Taana or Thaana, written from right to left. This script is relatively recent.

The literacy rate of the Maldives is very high (98%) compared to other South Asian countries. Since the 1960s English has become the medium of education in most schools although they still have Maldivian language classes, but Maldivian is still the language used for the overall administration.

Maldivian uses mainly the Thaana script for writing. It is an alphabet, with obligatory vowels derived from the vowel diacritics of the Arabic abjad. It is a largely phonemic script: With a few minor exceptions, spelling can be predicted from pronunciation, and pronunciation from spelling.

The origins of Thaana are unique among the world's alphabets: The first nine letters (h–v) are derived from the Arabic numerals, whereas the next nine (m–d) were the local Indic numerals. (See Hindu–Arabic numerals.) The remaining letters for loanwords (t–z) and Arabic transliteration are derived from phonetically similar native consonants by means of diacritics, with the exception of y (ޔ), which is derived from combining an alifu (އ) and a vaavu (ވ). This means that Thaana is one of the few alphabets not derived graphically from the original Semitic alphabet – unless the Indic numerals were (see Brahmi numerals). The Thaana alphabet (hā, shaviyani, nūnu, rā, bā, ...) does not follow the ancient order of the other Indic scripts (like Tamil) or the order of the Arabic alphabet.

Thaana, like Arabic, is written right to left. It indicates vowels with diacritic marks derived from Arabic. Each letter must carry either a vowel or a sukun, which indicates "no vowel". The only exception to this rule is noonu which, when written without a diacritic, indicates prenasalisation of a following stop.

The vowels are written with diacritical signs called fili. There are five fili for short vowels (a, i, u, e, o), with the first three being identical to the Arabic vowel signs (fatha, kasra and damma). Long vowels (aa, ee, oo, ey, oa) are denoted by doubled fili, except oa, which is a modification of the short obofili.

The letter alifu represents the glottal stop. It has three different purposes: It can act as a carrier for a vowel, that is, a word-initial vowel or the second part of a diphthong; when it carries a sukun, it indicates gemination of the following consonant; and if alifu+sukun occurs at the end of a word, it indicates that the word ends in a glottal stop. Gemination of nasals, however, is indicated by noonu+sukun preceding the nasal to be geminated.

Maldivian is also written in "Malé Latin" (most commonly used, such as when romanising place names). IAST transliteration is also sometimes used, and also the Devanāgarī script (almost never used in Maldives, but used in Minicoy)

== Latin transliteration ==
Towards the mid-1970s, during President Ibrahim Nasir's tenure, the Maldivian government introduced telex machines in the local administration. However, local Thaana script was deemed to be an obstacle because messages on the telex machines could only be written in the Latin script.

Following this, in 1976 the government approved a new official Latin transliteration, Dhivehi Latin, which was quickly implemented by the administration. Booklets were printed and dispatched to all Atoll and Island Offices, as well as schools and merchant liners. Clarence Maloney, an American anthropologist who was in the Maldives at the time of the change, lamented the inconsistencies of the "Dhivehi Latin" which ignored all previous linguistic research on the Maldivian language done by H.C.P. Bell and Wilhelm Geiger. He wondered why the modern Standard Indic transliteration had not been considered. Standard Indic is a consistent script system that is well adapted to writing almost all languages of South Asia. However, this scheme lacks a few sounds used in Maldivian. ISO 15919 has been used by Xavier Romero-Frias to romanise Maldivian in his book The Maldive Islanders - A Study of the Popular Culture of an Ancient Ocean Kingdom.

The government reinstated the Thaana script shortly after President Maumoon took power in 1978. However, the Latin transcription of 1976 continues to be widely used.

== Phonology ==
The sound system of Maldivian is similar to that of Dravidian languages. Like other modern Indo-Aryan languages the Maldivian phonemic inventory shows an opposition of long and short vowels, of dental and retroflex consonants, and of single and geminate consonants. However, unlike many other modern Indo-Aryan languages, it has no aspirates.

Vowels
	Front		Central		Back	
	short	long	short	long	short	long
Close	i	iː			u	uː
Mid	e	eː			o	oː
Open	(æː) (Note: [æː] is developed as a sound from the diphthong /ai/.)		a	aː		

Consonants
		Labial	Dental/ Alveolar	Retroflex	Palatal	Velar	Glottal
Nasal		m	n	(ɳ) (Note: /ɳ/ has merged with /n/ in the standard language, but it is still distinct in southern dialects.)	(ɲ) (Note: The status of /ɲ/ as a phoneme is unclear. Except for two words, /ɲamɲam/ cynometra cauliflora (a kind of fruit) and /ɲaʋijani/ 'Gnaviyani' (alphabet letter), the /ɲ/ only occurs as the result of the fusion of /n/ and /i/: /du:ni/ 'bird', /du:ɲɲeʔ/ 'a bird'.)		
Plosive/ Affricate	voiceless	p	t̪	ʈ	t͡ʃ	k	
Plosive/ Affricate	voiced	b	d̪	ɖ	d͡ʒ	ɡ	
Plosive/ Affricate	prenasal	ᵐb	ⁿd̪	ᶯɖ		ᵑɡ	
Fricative	voiceless	f	s̪	ʂ	ʃ		h
Fricative	voiced		z				
Approximant		ʋ (Note: /ʋ/ can occasionally be heard as a fricative [v], it has a [w] allophone occurring between vowel sounds /a/ and /u/.)	l̪	ɭ	j		
Tap				ɽ			

== Grammar ==
=== Nouns ===
Nouns in Maldivian inflect for animacy, definiteness, number and case. Nouns may be either human or non-human. Definiteness may be one of definite (no suffix), indefinite (-ek) or unspecified (-aku), although indefinite and unspecified are only distinguished in the direct case. Number may be singular or plural. Case may be one of direct, dative, ablative, genitive, locative, instrumental or sociative. However, human nouns cannot be in the instrumental or locative, and are sometimes avoided in the dative, with postpositions being used instead for the same meaning. Maldivian does not distinguish between the nominative and accusative cases, instead using the direct case for both subjects and direct objects. Nouns are marked first for number, then for definiteness, and then for case, e.g. ގެ އް ކެ ތަ ތް ކަ އް ސަ މަ masakkat̊-tak-ek̊-ge 'of some work'.

==== Case ====
	Non-human	Human
Direct	ބަސް bas 'language'	ކޮއްކޮ kokko 'younger sibling'
Sociative	ބަހާ bah-ā ‘with the language’	ކޮއްކޮއާ kokko-ā ‘with younger sibling’
Genitive	ބަހުގެ bah-uge ‘of the language’	ކޮއްކޮގެ kokko-ge ‘younger sibling’s’
Dative	ބަހަށް bah-aṣ ‘to/for the language’	ކޮއްކޮއަށް kokko-aṣ ‘to/for younger sibling’
Locative	ބަހުގައި bah-ugai ‘in the language’	–
Ablative	ބަހުން bah-un ‘from/by means of the language’	–

=== Numerals ===
Maldivian uses two numeral systems. Both of them are identical up to 30. After 30, however, one system places the unit numeral stem before the decade, for example, eh-thirees '31' (lit. "one and thirty") while the other combines the stem of the decade with the unit numeral, for example, thirees-ekeh '31' ("thirty + one"). The latter system also has numerals multiplied by ten for decades 70, 80 and 90. The decade fas dholhas '60' ("five twelves"), comes from a much older duodecimal, or dozen-based, system which has nearly disappeared.

=== Verbs ===
The Maldivian verbal system is characterised by a derivational relationship between active, causative and involitive/intransitive verb forms.

=== Word order ===
The word order in Maldivian is not as rigid as in English, though changes in the order of words in a sentence may convey subtle differences in meaning. To ask for some fish in a market, one uses the following words: mashah (to me) mas (fish) vikkaa (sell), which may be put in any of the following orders without a change in meaning:

mashah mas vikkaa
to.me fish sell
Sell me fish.

mas mashah vikkaa
fish to.me sell
Sell me fish.

mas vikkaa mashah
fish sell to.me
Sell me fish.

mashah vikka mas
to.me sell fish
sell me fish

vikka mas mashah
sell fish to.me
sell me fish

vikka mashah mas
sell to.me fish
sell me fish

The word mashah (to me) may be dropped wherever the context makes it obvious.

== Levels of speech ==
Inherent in the Maldivian language is a form of elaborate class distinction expressed through three levels: The highest level, the maaiy bas, formerly used to address members of the royal family, is now commonly used to show respect. People use the second level reethi bas and third level aadhaige bas in everyday life.

== Vocabulary ==
Maldivian contains many loanwords from other languages.

=== Word origins ===
After the arrival of Islam in South Asia, Persian and Arabic made a significant impact on Maldivian. It borrowed extensively from both languages, especially terms related to Islam and the judiciary. Some examples follow:

- namādu – "prayer" (from Classical Persian namāz)
- rōda – "fasting" (from Classical Persian rōza)
- hā–"yes"
- mēzu – "table" (from Classical Persian mēz)
- kāfaru – "non-believer" (from Arabic kāfir)
- tārīkh – "date" or "history" (from Arabic tārīkh)
- zarāfā – "giraffe" (from Arabic zarāfah)

French origin:

- gili-gili – "tickle-tickle" (from French guili-guili)

Portuguese influence in the language can be seen from the period of Portuguese colonial power in the region:

- lonsi – "hunting spear" (from Portuguese lança)

Maldivian has also borrowed words from Urdu, Hindi and more recently, English (in particular many scientific and technological terms).

English words are also commonly used in the spoken language, for example "phone", "note", "radio", and soatu ("shorts").

=== Some common phrases ===
Maldivian phrase	Transliteration	English
ޝުކުރިއްޔާ	Shukuriyyā	Thank you
ނޫން	Nūn	No
އެކުވެރިޔާ	Ekuveriyā	Friend

There is a small amount of Portuguese and English loanwords too, owing to colonialism and limited Western exposure.

== Sample ==
The following is a sample text in Maldivian, Article 1 of the Universal Declaration of Human Rights (by the United Nations):

މާއްދާ 1 - ހުރިހާ އިންސާނުން ވެސް އުފަންވަނީ، ދަރަޖަ އާއި ޙައްޤު ތަކުގައި މިނިވަންކަމާއި ހަމަހަމަކަން ލިބިގެންވާ ބައެއްގެ ގޮތުގައެވެ. އެމީހުންނަށް ހެޔޮ ވިސްނުމާއި ހެޔޮ ބުއްދީގެ ބާރު ލިބިގެން ވެއެވެ. އަދި އެމީހުން އެކަކު އަނެކަކާ މެދު މުއާމަލާތް ކުރަންވާނީ އުޚުއްވަތްތެރި ކަމުގެ ރޫހެއް ގައެވެ.

Romanisation (ISO 15919):

māddā 1 - hurihā insānun ves ufanvanī, darajaʾāi ḥaqqu takugai minivankamāi hamahamakan libigenvā baʾegge gotugaʾeve. Emīhunnaʾ heyo visnumāi heyo buddīge bāru libigenveʾeve. Adi emīhun ekaku anekakā medu muāmalāt kuranvānī uk͟huvvatteri kamuge rūheʾ gaʾeve.

Gloss (word-for-word):

Article 1 – All human-beings also are born, ranking and rights' in freedom and equality acquired people like. Them to good thinking and good brain's endowment acquired is. And they one another to communicate do should brotherhood's spirit with.

Translation (grammatical):

Article 1 – All human beings are born free and equal in ranking and rights. They are endowed with reason and conscience and should act towards one another in a spirit of brotherhood.

== Information technology ==
=== Typography ===
Founded in 1984, the Mahal Unit Press at Minicoy prints texts in Maldivian, among other languages. The press also publishes the Lakshadweep Times in three languages on a regular basis: Maldivian, English and Malayalam. This unit is based in the main building, constructed in 1998. For the first time in the history of Lakshadweep, Maldivian was brought into the field of typography.

Activities:

- Production of note books for the department of Education and Jawahar Navodaya School at Minicoy.
- Printing Maldivian textbooks for Standards I to IV.
- Undertaking printing work from the public on a payment basis.

=== Fonts ===
Freely downloadable open-source Unicode typefaces featuring Thaana letters include FreeSerif and MPH 2B Damase.

== See also ==
- Maldivian Sign Language

== Bibliography ==
- De Silva, M W S (1970). "Some Observations on the History of Dhivehi". Transactions of the Philological Society, London..
- Fritz, Sonja (2002), The Divehi Language: A Descriptive and Historical Grammar of the Maldivian and its Dialects, Heidelberg.
- Vitharana, V (1987), Sri Lanka – Maldivian Cultural Affinities, Academy of Sri Lankan Culture.
