= List of Maldives-related topics =

Topics relating to the Republic of Maldives

This is a list of topics related to Maldives.

== Buildings and structures in the Maldives ==
- Islamic Centre (Maldives)
- Ithaa
- National Library of Maldives
- National museum (Maldives)
- Theemuge
- Equatorial Convention Centre

=== Airports in the Maldives ===
- List of airports in the Maldives

==== International airports ====
- Gan International Airport
- Hanimaadhoo International Airport
- Maafaru International Airport
- Velana International Airport

==== Domestic airports ====
- Dhaalu Airport
- Dharavandhoo Airport
- Funadhoo Airport
- Fuvahmulah Airport
- Ifuru Airport
- Kaadedhdhoo Airport
- Kadhdhoo Airport
- Kooddoo Airport
- Kulhudhuffushi Airport
- Villa International Airport Maamigili
- Maavarulu Airport
- Madivaru Airport
- Thimarafushi Airport

=== Hospitals in the Maldives ===
- Indira Gandhi Memorial Hospital
- ADK Hospital
- Haa Alif Atoll Hospital
- Kulhudhuffushi Regional Hospital
- Shaviyani Atoll Hospital
- Noonu Atoll Hospital
- Ungoofaaru Regional Hospital
- Baa Atoll Hospital
- Lhaviyani Atoll Hospital
- Alif Alif Atoll Hospital
- Alif Dhaalu Atoll Hospital
- Vaavu Atoll Hospital
- Muli Regional Hospital
- Faafu Atoll Hospital
- Dhaalu Atoll Hospital
- Thaa Atoll Hospital
- Gan Regional Hospital
- Gaaf Alif Atoll Hospital
- Thinadhoo Regional Hospital
- Nyaviyani Atoll Hospital
- Hithadhoo Regional Hospital

=== Libraries in the Maldives ===
- National Law Library of the Maldives
- National Library of Maldives

=== Restaurants in the Maldives ===
- Ithaa

== Cities and towns in the Maldives ==
- List of cities, towns and villages in the Maldives
- Malé
- Addu City
- Fuvahmulah
- Kulhudhuffushi
- Maroshi
- Male Capital City of Maldives

== Communications in the Maldives ==
- Communications in the Maldives
- .mv

=== Maldivian media ===
- Newspapers in the Maldives
  - Maldivian journalists
    - Imad Latheef
- Television Maldives

=== Telecommunications companies of the Maldives ===
- Dhiraagu
- Raajjé Online
- Ooredoo Maldives

== Maldivian culture ==
- Maldivian cuisine
- Boduberu
- Culture of the Maldives
- Dhivehi Writing Systems
- Dhives Akuru
- Emblem of Maldives
- Flag of Maldives
- Folklore of the Maldives
- Garudhiya
- Gaumii salaam
- Thaana

=== Maldivian demons ===
- Rannamaari

=== Languages of the Maldives ===
- Dhivehi language

=== Maldivian music ===
- Music of the Maldives

=== Maldivian writers ===
Ahmed Mujuthaba (Kurinbee Live)

== Economy of the Maldives ==
- Economy of Maldives
- Bank of Maldives
- Currency of Maldives
- Economic aid to Maldives
- Finance in Maldives
- Industries in Maldives
- List of South Asian stock exchanges
- Maldives Monetary Authority
- Maldivian laari
- Maldivian rufiyaa

=== Companies of the Maldives ===
- Maldives Industrial Fisheries Company
- State Trading Organization

==== Banks of Maldives ====
- Bank of Maldives
- Maldives Islamic Bank

=== Trade unions of the Maldives ===
- Trade unions in Maldives

== Education in the Maldives ==
- Education in the Maldives
- Maldives College of Higher Education

=== Schools in the Maldives ===
- List of schools in the Maldives
- Aminiya School
- Dharumavantha School
- Ghiyasuddin International School
- Majeediyya School
- Imaduddin School

== Environment of the Maldives ==
=== Biota of the Maldives ===
==== Fauna of the Maldives ====
- List of birds of the Maldives

== Ethnic groups in the Maldives ==
- Ethnic groups of South Asia

== Geography of the Maldives ==
- Geography of the Maldives
- Demographics of the Maldives
- List of islands of the Maldives
- Huvafen Fushi

=== Atolls of the Maldives ===
- Atolls of the Maldives
- Alif Alif Atoll
- Alif Dhaal Atoll
- Ari (atoll)
- Baa Atoll
- Dhaalu Atoll
- Faafu Atoll
- Gaafu Alif Atoll
- Gaafu Dhaalu Atoll
- Gnaviyani Atoll
- Haa Alif Atoll
- Haa Dhaalu Atoll
- Huvadhoo Atoll
- Kaafu Atoll
- Laamu Atoll
- Lhaviyani Atoll
- Meemu Atoll
- Noonu Atoll
- Raa Atoll
- Seenu Atoll
- Shaviyani Atoll
- Thaa Atoll
- Vaavu Atoll

=== Islands of the Maldives ===
- 12 Blues
- Alifushi (Raa Atoll)
- Angolhitheemu (Raa Atoll)
- Baarah (Haa Alif Atoll)
- Bandidhoo (Dhaalu Atoll)
- Berinmadhoo (Haa Alif Atoll)
- Bileddhoo (Faafu Atoll)
- Bileffahi (Shaviyani Atoll)
- Bodufulhadhoo (Alif Alif Atoll)
- Burunee (Thaa Atoll)
- Dhuvaafaru (Raa Atoll)
- Dhaandhoo (Gaafu Alif Atoll)
- Dhanbidhoo (Laamu Atoll)
- Dhangethi (Alif Dhaal Atoll)
- Dharanboodhoo (Faafu Atoll)
- Dharavandhoo (Baa Atoll)
- Dhevvadhoo (Gaafu Alif Atoll)
- Dhiddhoo (Alif Dhaal Atoll)
- Dhiddhoo (Haa Alif Atoll)
- Dhiffushi (Kaafu Atoll)
- Dhiggaru (Meemu Atoll)
- Dhigurah (Alif Dhaal Atoll)
- Dhiyadhoo (Gaafu Alif Atoll)
- Dhiyamingili (Thaa Atoll)
- Dhonfanu (Baa Atoll)
- Eydhafushi (Baa Atoll)
- Fainu (Raa Atoll)
- Fares (Gaafu Dhaalu Atoll)
- Faridhoo (Haa Dhaalu Atoll)
- Feeali (Faafu Atoll)
- Feevah (Shaviyani Atoll)
- Fehendhoo (Baa Atoll)
- Felidhoo (Vaavu Atoll)
- Fenfushi (Alif Dhaal Atoll)
- Feridhoo (Alif Alif Atoll)
- Feydhoo (Seenu Atoll)
- Feydhoo (Shaviyani Atoll)
- Filladhoo (Haa Alif Atoll)
- Finey (Haa Dhaalu Atoll)
- Firunbaidhoo (Shaviyani Atoll)
- Fiyoaree (Gaafu Dhaalu Atoll)
- Foakaidhoo (Shaviyani Atoll)
- Foddhoo (Noonu Atoll)
- Fulhadhoo (Baa Atoll)
- Fulidhoo (Vaavu Atoll)
- Funadhoo (Shaviyani Atoll)
- Fuvammulah (Gnaviyani Atoll)
- Gaadhiffushi (Thaa Atoll)
- Gaadhoo (Laamu Atoll)
- Gaafaru (Kaafu Atoll)
- Gaddhoo (Gaafu Dhaalu Atoll)
- Gan (Laamu Atoll)
- Gan (Seenu Atoll)
- Gemanafushi (Gaafu Alif Atoll)
- Gemendhoo (Dhaalu Atoll)
- Goidhoo (Baa Atoll)
- Goidhoo (Shaviyani Atoll)
- Gulhi (Kaafu Atoll)
- Guraidhoo (Kaafu Atoll)
- Guraidhoo (Thaa Atoll)
- Haggnaameedhoo (Alif Dhaal Atoll)
- Hanimaadhoo (Haa Dhaalu Atoll)
- Hathifushi (Haa Alif Atoll)
- Henbandhoo (Noonu Atoll)
- Himandhoo (Alif Alif Atoll)
- Himmafushi (Kaafu Atoll)
- Hinnavaru (Lhaviyani Atoll)
- Hirilandhoo (Thaa Atoll)
- Hirimaradhoo (Haa Dhaalu Atoll)
- Hithaadhoo (Baa Atoll)
- Hithadhoo (Laamu Atoll)
- Hithadhoo (Seenu Atoll)
- Hoandeddhoo (Gaafu Dhaalu Atoll)
- Hoarafushi (Haa Alif Atoll)
- Holhudhoo (Noonu Atoll)
- Hulhudheli (Dhaalu Atoll)
- Hulhudhoo (Seenu Atoll)
- Hulhudhuffaaru (Raa Atoll)
- Hulhulé Island
- Hulhumalé
- Hulhumeedhoo (Seenu Atoll)
- Huraa (Kaafu Atoll)
- Ihavandhoo (Haa Alif Atoll)
- Inguraidhoo (Raa Atoll)
- Innamaadhoo (Raa Atoll)
- Isdhoo (Laamu Atoll)
- Kaashidhoo (Kaafu Atoll)
- Kalaidhoo (Laamu Atoll)
- Kamadhoo (Baa Atoll)
- Kandholhudhoo (Raa Atoll)
- Kanditheemu (Shaviyani Atoll)
- Kandoodhoo (Thaa Atoll)
- Kanduhulhudhoo (Gaafu Alif Atoll)
- Kelaa (Haa Alif Atoll)
- Kendhikolhudhoo (Noonu Atoll)
- Kendhoo (Baa Atoll)
- Keyodhoo (Vaavu Atoll)
- Kihaadhoo (Baa Atoll)
- Kinbidhoo (Thaa Atoll)
- Kinolhas (Raa Atoll)
- Kolamaafushi (Gaafu Alif Atoll)
- Kolhufushi (Meemu Atoll)
- Komandoo (Shaviyani Atoll)
- Kudafaree (Noonu Atoll)
- Kudahuvadhoo (Dhaalu Atoll)
- Kudarikilu (Baa Atoll)
- Kulhudhuffushi (Haa Dhaalu Atoll)
- Kumundhoo (Haa Dhaalu Atoll)
- Kunahandhoo (Laamu Atoll)
- Kunburudhoo (Alif Dhaal Atoll)
- Kunburudhoo (Haa Dhaalu Atoll)
- Kurendhoo (Lhaviyani Atoll)
- Kurinbi (Haa Dhaalu Atoll)
- Landhoo (Noonu Atoll)
- Lhaimagu (Shaviyani Atoll)
- Lhohi (Noonu Atoll)
- Lhohifushi
- Maabaidhoo (Laamu Atoll)
- Maaenboodhoo (Dhaalu Atoll)
- Maafaru (Noonu Atoll)
- Maafilaafushi (Lhaviyani Atoll)
- Maafushi (Kaafu Atoll)
- Maakandoodhoo
- Maakurathu (Raa Atoll)
- Maalhendhoo (Noonu Atoll)
- Maalhos (Alif Alif Atoll)
- Maalhos (Baa Atoll)
- Maamendhoo (Gaafu Alif Atoll)
- Maamendhoo (Laamu Atoll)
- Maamingili (Alif Dhaal Atoll)
- Maarandhoo (Haa Alif Atoll)
- Maathodaa (Gaafu Dhaalu Atoll)
- Maaungoodhoo (Shaviyani Atoll)
- Maavah (Laamu Atoll)
- Maavaidhoo (Haa Dhaalu Atoll)
- Madaveli (Gaafu Dhaalu Atoll)
- Madifushi (Meemu Atoll)
- Madifushi (Thaa Atoll)
- Maduvvaree (Meemu Atoll)
- Maduvvaree (Raa Atoll)
- Magoodhoo (Faafu Atoll)
- Magoodhoo (Noonu Atoll)
- Mahibadhoo (Alif Dhaal Atoll)
- Makunudhoo (Haa Dhaalu Atoll)
- Malé
- Manadhoo (Noonu Atoll)
- Mandhoo (Alif Dhaal Atoll)
- Maradhoo (Seenu Atoll)
- Maradhoo-Feydhoo (Seenu Atoll)
- Maroshi (Shaviyani Atoll)
- Mathiveri (Alif Alif Atoll)
- Meedhoo (Dhaalu Atoll)
- Meedhoo (Raa Atoll)
- Meedhoo (Seenu Atoll)
- Miladhoo (Noonu Atoll)
- Milandhoo (Shaviyani Atoll)
- Mulah (Meemu Atoll)
- Mulhadhoo (Haa Alif Atoll)
- Muli (Meemu Atoll)
- Mundoo (Laamu Atoll)
- Muraidhoo (Haa Alif Atoll)
- Naalaafushi (Meemu Atoll)
- Nadellaa (Gaafu Dhaalu Atoll)
- Naifaru (Lhaviyani Atoll)
- Naivaadhoo (Haa Dhaalu Atoll)
- Narudhoo (Shaviyani Atoll)
- Nellaidhoo (Haa Dhaalu Atoll)
- Neykurendhoo (Haa Dhaalu Atoll)
- Nilandhoo (Faafu Atoll)
- Nilandhoo (Gaafu Alif Atoll)
- Nolhivaram (Haa Dhaalu Atoll)
- Nolhivaranfaru (Haa Dhaalu Atoll)
- Noomaraa (Shaviyani Atoll)
- Olhuvelifushi (Lhaviyani Atoll)
- Omadhoo (Alif Dhaal Atoll)
- Omadhoo (Thaa Atoll)
- Raimmandhoo (Meemu Atoll)
- Rakeedhoo (Vaavu Atoll)
- Rasdhoo (Alif Alif Atoll)
- Rasgetheemu (Raa Atoll)
- Rathafandhoo (Gaafu Dhaalu Atoll)
- Rinbudhoo (Dhaalu Atoll)
- Thakandhoo (Haa Alif Atoll)
- Thilafushi
- Thimarafushi (Thaa Atoll)
- Thinadhoo (Gaafu Dhaalu Atoll)
- Thinadhoo (Vaavu Atoll)
- Thinrukéréhaa
- Thoddoo (Alif Alif Atoll)
- Thulhaadhoo (Baa Atoll)
- Thulusdhoo (Kaafu Atoll)
- Thuraakunu (Haa Alif Atoll)
- Ukulhas (Alif Alif Atoll)
- Uligamu (Haa Alif Atoll)
- Ungoofaaru (Raa Atoll)
- Utheemu (Haa Alif Atoll)
- Vaadhoo (Gaafu Dhaalu Atoll)
- Vaadhoo (Raa Atoll)
- Vaanee (Dhaalu Atoll)
- Veymandoo (Thaa Atoll)

=== Uninhabited islands of the Maldives ===
- Aarah (Kaafu Atoll)
- Aarah (Raa Atoll)
- Aarah (Vaavu Atoll)
- Aboohéra
- Akirifushi
- Alikoirah (Alif Dhaal Atoll)
- Aluvifushi
- Angaagaa
- Araigaiththaa
- Ariadhoo
- Asdhoo
- Athurugau
- Baavandhoo
- Baberaahuttaa
- Badidhiffusheefinolhu
- Bakeiththaa
- Baros (island)
- Beyruhuttaa
- Beyrumaddoo
- Bihuréhaa
- Biyaadhoo
- Boaddoo
- Bodubandos
- Bodufinolhu (Alif Dhaal Atoll)
- Bodufinolhu (Kaafu Atoll)
- Bodufushi (Dhaalu Atoll)
- Boduhithi
- Boduhuraa (Kaafu Atoll)
- Bodukaashihuraa
- Bodéhuttaa
- Bolifushi
- Budhiyahuttaa
- Bulhaaholhi
- Bulhalafushi
- Dhebaidhoo
- Dhehasanulunboihuraa
- Dhevvalaabadhoo
- Dhevvamaagalaa
- Dhiddhoofinolhu
- Dhiffushi (Alif Dhaal Atoll)
- Dhiggaru (Alif Dhaal Atoll)
- Dhigudhoo
- Dhigufinolhu
- Dhigurah (Gaafu Alif Atoll)
- Dhiguvarufinolhu
- Dhigémaahuttaa
- Dhonhuseenahuttaa
- Dhoonidhoo
- Dhoores
- Ehrruh-haa
- Enboodhoo (Alif Dhaal Atoll)
- Enboodhoo (Kaafu Atoll)
- Enboodhoofinolhu
- Enboodhoofushi
- Enbulufushi
- Eriyadhoo (Kaafu Atoll)
- Faandhoo
- Faanuvaahuraa
- Falhumaafushi
- Falhuverrehaa
- Farudhulhudhoo
- Farukolhufushi
- Fenrahaa
- Fenrahaahuttaa
- Feydhoofinolhu
- Fihalhohi
- Filitheyo
- Finolhu
- Fulhadhoorah kairi finonolhu
- Funadhoo (Kaafu Atoll)
- Funadhoovillingili
- Funamaddoo
- Furan-nafushi
- Fénéhuttaa
- Gaadhiffushi (Dhaalu Atoll)
- Galamadhoo
- Gasfinolhu (Alif Dhaal Atoll)
- Gasfinolhu (Kaafu Atoll)
- Giraavaru (Kaafu Atoll)
- Girifushi
- Gulheegaathuhuraa
- Haagevillaa
- Hadahaa
- Hagedhoo
- Heenamaagalaa
- Heenfaru
- Helengeli
- Henbadhoo
- Himithi
- Hirihuttaa
- Hiriyanfushi (Dhaalu Atoll)
- Hithaadhoo (Gaafu Alif Atoll)
- Hithaadhoogalaa
- Hiyafushi
- Hudhufusheefinolhu
- Hukurudhoo
- Hulhimendhoo (Gaafu Alif Atoll)
- Hulhuvehi
- Hunadhoo
- Huraagandu
- Hurasdhoo
- Hurendhoo
- Huruelhi
- Huvahendhoo
- Idimaa
- Ihuru
- Innafushi (Alif Dhaal Atoll)
- Innaréhaa
- Issari
- Jinnathugau
- Kagi (island)
- Kalhehuttaa
- Kalhudhiréhaa
- Kalhuhandhihuraa
- Kalhuhuraa (Kaafu Atoll)
- Kandinma
- Kandoomaafushi
- Kandoomoonufushi
- Kanduoih-giri
- Kanduvillingili
- Kanifinolhu
- Kanneiyfaru
- Kanuhuraa (Kaafu Atoll)
- Kedhigandu
- Keesseyréhaa
- Kendheraa
- Kiraidhoo
- Koduhuttaa
- Kondeymatheelaabadhoo
- Kondeyvillingili
- Kudabandos
- Kudadhoo (Alif Dhaal Atoll)
- Kudafinolhu (Kaafu Atoll)
- Kudahithi
- Kudahuraa (Kaafu Atoll)
- Kudalafari
- Kudarah (Alif Dhaal Atoll)
- Kuddoo
- Kudhébondeyyo
- Kudhéfehélaa
- Kudhéhuttaa
- Kureddhoo (Gaafu Alif Atoll)
- Lankanfinolhu
- Lankanfushi
- Lhohi (Dhaalu Atoll)
- Lhosfushi
- Lhossaa
- Maadheli
- Maadhiguvaru
- Maadhoo (Kaafu Atoll)
- Maafushi (Dhaalu Atoll)
- Maafushi (Faafu Atoll)
- Maafushivaru
- Maaféhélaa
- Maagau
- Maagehuttaa
- Maakanaarataa
- Maamendhoo (Seenu Atoll)
- Maamutaa
- Maarandhoo (Gaafu Alif Atoll)
- Maaréhaa
- Maavaruhuraa
- Machchafushi
- Madivaru (Kaafu Atoll)
- Madivaruhuraa
- Mahaanaélhihuraa
- Mahaddhoo
- Makunudhoo (Kaafu Atoll)
- Makunueri
- Makunufushi
- Maléfaru
- Maththidhoo
- Maththuréhaa
- Medhufinolhu (Alif Dhaal Atoll)
- Medhufinolhu (Kaafu Atol)
- Medhuréhaa
- Meedhuffushi
- Meedhupparu
- Meerufenfushi (Kaafu Atoll)
- Melaimu
- Meradhoo
- Minimasgali (Dhaalu Atoll)
- Minimasgali (Faafu Atoll)
- Minimensaa
- Mirihi
- Moofushi
- Muddhoo
- Munaagala
- Munandhoo
- Muthaafushi
- Médhuburiyaa
- Médhuhuttaa
- Naibukaloabodufushi
- Nakachchaafushi
- Nalaguraidhoo
- Odagallaa
- Olhahali
- Olhuveli (Dhaalu Atoll)
- Olhuveli (Kaafu Atoll)

=== Maldives geography stubs ===
- Aarah (Kaafu Atoll)
- Aarah (Raa Atoll)
- Aarah (Vaavu Atoll)
- Akirifushi
- Alif Alif Atoll
- Alif Dhaal Atoll
- Alifushi (Raa Atoll)
- Alikoirah (Alif Dhaal Atoll)
- Aluvifushi
- Angaagaa
- Angolhitheemu (Raa Atoll)
- Araigaiththaa
- Ari (atoll)
- Ariadhoo
- Asdhoo
- Athurugau
- Baa Atoll
- Baarah (Haa Alif Atoll)
- Baavandhoo
- Baberaahuttaa
- Badidhiffusheefinolhu
- Bakeiththaa
- Bandidhoo (Dhaalu Atoll)
- Baros (island)
- Berinmadhoo (Haa Alif Atoll)
- Beyruhuttaa
- Beyrumaddoo
- Bihuréhaa
- Bileddhoo (Faafu Atoll)
- Bileffahi (Shaviyani Atoll)
- Biyaadhoo
- Boaddoo
- Bodubandos
- Bodufinolhu (Alif Dhaal Atoll)
- Bodufinolhu (Kaafu Atoll)
- Bodufulhadhoo (Alif Alif Atoll)
- Bodufushi (Dhaalu Atoll)
- Boduhithi
- Bodukaashihuraa
- Bodéhuttaa
- Bolifushi
- Budhiyahuttaa
- Bulhaaholhi
- Bulhalafushi
- Burunee (Thaa Atoll)
- Dhaalu Atoll
- Dhaandhoo (Gaafu Alif Atoll)
- Dhanbidhoo (Laamu Atoll)
- Dhangethi (Alif Dhaal Atoll)
- Dharanboodhoo (Faafu Atoll)
- Dharavandhoo (Baa Atoll)
- Dhebaidhoo
- Dhehasanulunboihuraa
- Dhevvadhoo (Gaafu Alif Atoll)
- Dhevvalaabadhoo
- Dhevvamaagalaa
- Dhiddhoo (Alif Dhaal Atoll)
- Dhiddhoo (Haa Alif Atoll)
- Dhiddhoofinolhu
- Dhiffushi (Alif Dhaal Atoll)
- Dhiffushi (Kaafu Atoll)
- Dhiggaru (Alif Dhaal Atoll)
- Dhiggaru (Meemu Atoll)
- Dhigudhoo
- Dhigufinolhu
- Dhigurah (Alif Dhaal Atoll)
- Dhigurah (Gaafu Alif Atoll)
- Dhiguvarufinolhu
- Dhigémaahuttaa
- Dhiyadhoo (Gaafu Alif Atoll)
- Dhiyamingili (Thaa Atoll)
- Dhonfanu (Baa Atoll)
- Dhonhuseenahuttaa
- Dhoonidhoo
- Dhoores
- Ehrruh-haa
- Enboodhoo (Alif Dhaal Atoll)
- Enboodhoo (Kaafu Atoll)
- Enboodhoofinolhu
- Enboodhoofushi
- Enbulufushi
- Eriyadhoo (Kaafu Atoll)
- Eydhafushi (Baa Atoll)
- Faafu Atoll
- Faandhoo
- Faanuvaahuraa
- Fainu (Raa Atoll)
- Falhumaafushi
- Falhuverrehaa
- Fares (Gaafu Dhaalu Atoll)
- Faridhoo (Haa Dhaalu Atoll)
- Farudhulhudhoo
- Farukolhufushi
- Feeali (Faafu Atoll)
- Feevah (Shaviyani Atoll)
- Fehendhoo (Baa Atoll)
- Felidhoo (Vaavu Atoll)
- Fenfushi (Alif Dhaal Atoll)
- Fenrahaa
- Fenrahaahuttaa
- Feridhoo (Alif Alif Atoll)
- Feydhoo (Seenu Atoll)
- Feydhoo (Shaviyani Atoll)
- Feydhoofinolhu
- Filladhoo (Haa Alif Atoll)
- Finey (Haa Dhaalu Atoll)
- Finolhu
- Firunbaidhoo (Shaviyani Atoll)
- Fiyoaree (Gaafu Dhaalu Atoll)
- Foakaidhoo (Shaviyani Atoll)
- Foddhoo (Noonu Atoll)
- Fonadhoo (Laamu Atoll)
- Fulhadhoo (Baa Atoll)
- Fulhadhoorah kairi finonolhu
- Fulidhoo (Vaavu Atoll)
- Funadhoo (Kaafu Atoll)
- Funadhoo (Shaviyani Atoll)
- Funadhoovillingili
- Funamaddoo
- Furan-nafushi
- Fénéhuttaa
- Gaadhiffushi (Dhaalu Atoll)
- Gaadhiffushi (Thaa Atoll)
- Gaadhoo (Laamu Atoll)
- Gaafaru (Kaafu Atoll)
- Gaafu Alif Atoll
- Gaafu Dhaalu Atoll
- Gaddhoo (Gaafu Dhaalu Atoll)
- Galamadhoo
- Gan (Laamu Atoll)
- Gan (Seenu Atoll)
- Gasfinolhu (Alif Dhaal Atoll)
- Gasfinolhu (Kaafu Atoll)
- Gemanafushi (Gaafu Alif Atoll)
- Gemendhoo (Dhaalu Atoll)
- Giraavaru (Kaafu Atoll)
- Girifushi
- Gnaviyani Atoll
- Goidhoo (Baa Atoll)
- Goidhoo (Shaviyani Atoll)
- Gulheegaathuhuraa
- Gulhi (Kaafu Atoll)
- Guraidhoo (Kaafu Atoll)
- Guraidhoo (Thaa Atoll)
- Haa Alif Atoll
- Haa Dhaalu Atoll
- Haagevillaa
- Hadahaa
- Hagedhoo
- Haggnaameedhoo (Alif Dhaal Atoll)
- Hanimaadhoo (Haa Dhaalu Atoll)
- Hathifushi (Haa Alif Atoll)
- Heenamaagalaa
- Heenfaru
- Helengeli
- Henbadhoo
- Henbandhoo (Noonu Atoll)
- Himandhoo (Alif Alif Atoll)
- Himithi
- Himmafushi (Kaafu Atoll)
- Hinnavaru (Lhaviyani Atoll)
- Hirihuttaa
- Hirilandhoo (Thaa Atoll)
- Hirimaradhoo (Haa Dhaalu Atoll)
- Hithaadhoo (Baa Atoll)
- Hithaadhoo (Gaafu Alif Atoll)
- Hithaadhoogalaa
- Hithadhoo (Laamu Atoll)
- Hithadhoo (Seenu Atoll)
- Hiyafushi
- Hoandeddhoo (Gaafu Dhaalu Atoll)
- Hoarafushi (Haa Alif Atoll)
- Holhudhoo (Noonu Atoll)
- Hudhufusheefinolhu
- Hukurudhoo
- Hulhimendhoo (Gaafu Alif Atoll)
- Hulhudheli (Dhaalu Atoll)
- Hulhudhoo (Seenu Atoll)
- Hulhudhuffaaru (Raa Atoll)
- Hulhulé Island
- Hulhumeedhoo (Seenu Atoll)
- Hulhuvehi
- Hunadhoo
- Huraagandu
- Hurasdhoo
- Hurendhoo
- Huruelhi
- Huvadhoo Atoll
- Huvafen Fushi
- Huvahendhoo
- Idimaa
- Ihuru
- Inguraidhoo (Raa Atoll)
- Innafushi (Alif Dhaal Atoll)

== Government of the Maldives ==
- Bank of Maldives
- Constitution of the Maldives
- Maldives Monetary Authority
- President of the Maldives

=== Foreign relations of the Maldives ===
- Foreign relations of the Maldives
  - The Maldives and the Commonwealth of Nations
  - India–Maldives relations
  - Israel–Maldives relations
  - Japan–Maldives relations
  - Malaysia–Maldives relations
  - Maldives–Pakistan relations
  - Maldives–Sri Lanka relations
  - Maldives–United States relations
- Economic aid to Maldives
- Maldivian diplomatic missions
- South Asia Co-operative Environment Programme
- South Asian Association for Regional Cooperation

=== Sultans of the Maldives ===
- Abdul Majeed Didi
- Dhiyamigili dynasty
- Muhammad Fareed Didi
- Haajee Imaaduddeen
- Hassan Nooraddeen I
- Hassan Nooraddeen Iskandar II
- Hilaalee dynasty
- House of Theemuge
- Huraa dynasty
- Ibrahim Nooraddeen
- Isdhoo dynasty
- Mohamed bin Hajj Ali Thukkala
- Muhammad Imaaduddeen IV
- Muhammad Imaaduddeen V
- Muhammad Mueenuddeen I
- Muhammad Mueenuddeen II
- Muhammad Shamsuddeen III
- Zakwaan dynasty(short people)
- Nasiruddin I Sri Veeru Abarana Mahaa Radun
- Sultan Al-Haj Muhammed Ghiya'as ud-din Iskandar Sri Kula Sundara Maha Radun
- Sultan Muhammad Mu'iz ud-din Iskander ibni al-Marhum Shah Ghazi al-Hasan 'Izz ud-din
- Sultan Muhammad Shams ud-din Iskandar II
- Sultan al-Ghazi al-Hasan 'Izz ud-din Sri Kula Ranmiba Danala Kirti Kattiri Buwana Maha Radun
- Utheemu dynasty
- List of Maldivian monarchs

== Health in the Maldives ==
- Journey (NGO)

== History of the Maldives ==
- History of the Maldives
- Abdullah Afeef
- Abdul Majeed Didi
- Black Friday (Maldives)
- Dhiyamigili dynasty
- Effect of the 2004 Indian Ocean earthquake on the Maldives
- Giraavaru (Kaafu Atoll)
- Hilaalee dynasty
- House of Theemuge
- Huraa dynasty
- Isdhoo dynasty
- Prince Abdulla
- François Pyrard de Laval
- RAF Gan
- Second Republic (Maldive Islands)
- United Suvadive Republic
- Utheemu dynasty
- Zakwaan dynasty(short people)

=== Elections in the Maldives ===
- Elections in the Maldives

=== Riots and civil unrest in the Maldives ===
- 2003 Maldives civil unrest
- 2005 Maldives civil unrest

=== Suvadives ===
- United Suvadive Republic

==== History of the Suvadives ====
- Abdullah Afeef

== Maldivian law ==
- Constitution of the Maldives
- National Law Library of the Maldives

=== Maldivian judges ===
==== Qazis of the Maldives ====
- List of Qazis of the Maldives
- Mohamed bin Hajj Ali Thukkala
- Ustaz Mohamed Rasheed Ibrahim

== Military of the Maldives ==
- Military of the Maldives
- Maldives National Defence Force
- Maldivian Coast Guard
- Special Forces

== Organisations based in the Maldives ==
- Maldives Girl Guide Association
- The Scout Association of Maldives

=== Political parties in the Maldives ===
- List of political parties in the Maldives
- Gaumee Itthihaad(GIP)
- Dhivehi Rayyithunge Party
- Islamic Democratic Party (Maldives)
- Justice Party (Maldives)
- Maldivian Democratic Party

== Maldivian people ==
See List of Maldivians

== Politics of the Maldives ==
- Politics of the Maldives

=== Maldivian politicians ===
- Maumoon Abdul Gayoom
- Alhan Fahmy
- Dr. Mohammed Waheed Hassan
- Hassan Saeed
- Nasreena Ibrahim
- Fathulla Jameel
- Mohamed Latheef
- Mohamed Latheef (ambassador)
- Dunya Maumoon
- Mohamed Amin Didi
- Mohamed Munavvar
- Mohamed Nasheed
- Mohamed Zahir Hussain
- Ibrahim Nasir
- Ahmed Thasmeen Ali
- Fathimath Dhiyana Saeed

== Religion in the Maldives ==
- Islam in the Maldives
- Catholic Church in the Maldives
- Hinduism in Maldives

== Maldivian society ==
- Demographics of the Maldives

== Sport in the Maldives ==
=== Football in the Maldives ===
- Football Association of Maldives
- Maldives national football team

==== Maldivian football clubs ====
- Club Valencia
- New Radiant
- Victory SC
- Thoddoo FC

==== Maldives football competitions ====
- Dhivehi League

==== Football venues in Maldives ====
- Rasmee Dhandu Stadium

=== Basketball in the Maldives ===
- Maldives Basketball Association

==== Maldivian basketball clubs ====
- The Group SC

=== Maldives at the Olympics ===
- Maldives at the 1988 Summer Olympics
- Maldives at the 1992 Summer Olympics
- Maldives at the 1996 Summer Olympics
- Maldives at the 2000 Summer Olympics
- Maldives at the 2004 Summer Olympics
- Maldives at the 2008 Summer Olympics
- Maldives at the 2012 Summer Olympics
- Maldives at the 2016 Summer Olympics
- Maldives at the 2020 Summer Olympics

== Tourism in the Maldives ==
- Tourism in the Maldives
- Ithaa

=== Airlines of the Maldives ===
- Maldivian
- Manta Air
- Trans Maldivian Airways
- Flyme

==== Defunct airlines of the Maldives ====
- Maldives International Airlines
- Maldives Airways
- Mega Maldives
- Inter Atoll Air
- Seagull Airways
- Air Maldives
- Air Equator
- Ocean Air
- Maldivian Air Taxi

== Transport in the Maldives ==
- Transport in the Maldives

== Maldives stubs ==
- Template:Maldives-stub
- Template:Maldives-bio-stub
- .mv
- Aafathis Daily
- Abdul Majeed Didi
- Abdullah Afeef
- Ahmed Thasmeen Ali
- Air Maldives
- Ali Rameez
- Aminiya School
- Bokkura
- Club Valencia
- Constitution of the Maldives
- Culture of the Maldives
- Dharumavantha School
- Dhivehi Rayyithunge Party
- Dhivehi Writing Systems
- Dhiyamigili dynasty
- Dhoni
- Dunya Maumoon
- Economic aid to Maldives
- Education in the Maldives
- Elections in the Maldives
- Emblem of Maldives
- Eveyla Akuru
- Fathimath Shafeega
- Fathulla Jameel
- Foreign relations of the Maldives
- Ghiyasuddin School
- Haajee Imaaduddeen
- Haama Daily
- Hassan Nooraddeen I
- Hassan Nooraddeen Iskandar II
- Hassan Saeed
- Hilaalee dynasty
- House of Theemuge
- Huraa dynasty
- Ibrahim Nooraddeen
- Imran Mohamed
- Isdhoo dynasty
- Islamic Centre (Maldives)
- Islamic Democratic Party (Maldives)
- Jazeeraa Daily
- Justice Party (Maldives)
- List of newspapers in Maldives
- Majlis of the Maldives
- Maldives College of Higher Education
- Maldives Girl Guide Association
- Maldives Monetary Authority
- Maldives at the 1988 Summer Olympics
- Maldives at the 1992 Summer Olympics
- Maldives at the 1996 Summer Olympics
- Maldives at the 2000 Summer Olympics
- Maldives national football team
- Maldivian Air Taxi
- Maldivian laari
- Malé English School
- Miadhu Daily
- Military of the Maldives
- Minivan Daily
- Mohamed Amin Didi
- Mohamed Latheef
- Mohamed Munavvar
- Mohamed Zahir Hussain
- Mohamed bin Hajj Ali Thukkala
- Muhammad Fareed Didi
- Muhammad Imaaduddeen IV
- Muhammad Imaaduddeen V
- Muhammad Mueenuddeen I
- Muhammad Mueenuddeen II
- Muhammad Shamsuddeen III
- Nasreena Ibrahim
- Naushad Waheed
- New Radiant
- President of the Maldives
- Prince Abdulla
- Raajjé Online
- Rasmee Dhandu Stadium
- Second Republic (Maldive Islands)
- Sultan Muhammad Mu'iz ud-din Iskander ibni al-Marhum Shah Ghazi al-Hasan 'Izz ud-din
- Sultan Muhammad Shams ud-din Iskandar II
- Sultan Saeed
- Sultan al-Ghazi al-Hasan 'Izz ud-din Sri Kula Ranmiba Danala Kirti Kattiri Buwana Maha Radun
- Television Maldives
- The Scout Association of Maldives
- Theemuge
- Three Ages of Maldivian Literature
- Trade unions in Maldives
- Ustaz Mohamed Rasheed Ibrahim
- Utheemu dynasty

== See also ==
- Lists of country-related topics - similar lists for other countries
