= List of Maldivians =

List of notable people from the Maldives

For information about the Maldivian people as a whole, see Demographics of the Maldives and Culture of the Maldives.

This is a list of notable Maldivians (people from the Maldives, or of Maldivian descent).

== General people ==
- Muhammad Thakurufaanu al-Auzam
- Mohamed Zahir Hussain
- Ilyas Hussain Ibrahim
- Moosa Ali Jaleel
- Jameela Ali Khalid
- Imad Latheef
- Jennifer Latheef
- Ahmed Shafeeq Ibrahim Moosa
- Mohamed Munavvar
- Hassan Evan Naseem
- Hassan Saeed
- Sultan Saeed
- Husain Salaahuddin
- Fathimath Shafeega
- Mohamed bin Hajj Ali Thukkala
- Hassan Ugail
- Naushad Waheed
- Mohamed Zahir

=== Military personnel ===
- Major General Abdulla Shamaal

=== Computer scientists ===
- Hassan Ugail

=== Lawyers ===
- Mohamed Munavvar
- Hassan Saeed

=== Mathematicians ===
- Hassan Ugail

=== Diplomats ===
- Abdul Samad Abdulla
- Ahmed Thasmeen Ali
- Visam Ali
- Hala Hameed
- Hamdhoon Hameed
- Thilmeeza Hussain
- Jameela Ali Khalid
- Ahmed Mahloof
- Ali Naseer Mohamed
- Ahmed Naseem
- Fathimath Dhiyana Saeed
- Ahmed Sareer
- Ahmed Shiaan
- Hassan Sobir
- Farahanaz Faizal
- Dunya Maumoon
- Aishath Nahula
- Fathimath Dhiyana Saeed
- Mizna Shareef
- Rashida Yoosuf

== Extrajudicial prisoners of the United States ==
- Ibrahim Fauzee

== Royal families ==
- Dhiyamigili dynasty
- Hilaalee dynasty
- Huraa dynasty
- Isdhoo dynasty
- House of Theemuge
- Utheemu dynasty
