= Ahmadhiyya International School =

K–12 school in Malé City, Maldives

Coordinates: 4.172074°N 73.508896°E

- އަޙްމަދިއްޔާ އިންޓަނޭޝަނަލް ސްކޫލް

Location
- Buruzu Magu; Malé City, Machchangolhi, Kaafu Atoll 20178; Maldives

Information
- School type: Kindergarten, Primary, Secondary
- Motto: Appreciate Innovate Stimulate
- Founded: 21 February 1982
- Founder: Dr. Ahmed Didi
- Principal: Mr. Mohamed Rasheed
- Houses: Chaandhanee, Huvandhumaa, Janavaree, and Kaaminee
- Colours: Grey, Green
- Website: ahmadhiyya.edu.mv
- Last updated: 27 July 2024

Ahmadhiyya International School (Dhivehi: އަޙްމަދިއްޔާ އިންޓަނޭޝަނަލް ސްކޫލް), previously known as Madhrasathul Ahmadhiyaa, is a Maldivian private school, which is located very close to the well-known Billabong High International School and Ghiyasuddin International School. It is also the first school in the Maldives to have their own news website about the affairs of the school called Ahmadhiyya 1982. The school has participated and won in many interschool competitions.

Ahmadhiyya had originally started with 60 students. The school is the official school of Machangoalhi, one of the wards (districts) of Malé, and was run by the Machangoalhi Ward Office.

There are 2 school captains currently in this school. Which are: Mohamed Yanish and Fathimath Jaisha Asim. This was decided by the school as a result of a close draw in the election results between Sir Yanish and Ms. Jaisha. In addition, there are two deputy captains as well. Which are Shayaan bin Shifau and Mariyam Arafa. This was decided by the school as a result of having the next most votes after Sir Yanish and Ms. Jaisha.

== History of Ahmadhiyya ==
President Maumoon Abdul Gayyoom met with some high ranking private entrepreneurs at Iskandhar School. Discussion sparked among them to plan the construction of a school for the children from Machchangolhi Ward, unable to attend school due to various reasons should be given the opportunity to do so. As a result, when a request was made to the president for the acquisition of a plot of land, an area of 8000 square feet was allocated soon after the land-filling projects to fuel the ever growing population of Malé.

The foundation of the school was laid down by His Excellency Maumoon Abdul Gayyoom on 14 June 1979. After construction time of two years, eight months and 18 days. The school was finally opened to the public on 21 February 1982 once again by President Maumoon Abdul Gayyoom. The school opened with just eight classes, an administration office, a small office for the Machchangolhi Ward Community, a water tank and three toilets.

When the school was first opened, it was made to be exclusively for the Machchangolhi Ward children whom were too poor to afford studying in other ward schools with only few seats allocated for students from other wards. After much pressure from the residents in other wards, Dr. Ahmed Didi allowed for students from any ward to study here. Right after this change, many students from all around Male' flocked into Ahmadhiyya. This was when the school was given the title of the most populated school in Maldives with an student population of over 200.

Dr. Ahmed Didi and his wife Mrs. Saeeda Ibrahim provided all the 200 students with up to date textbooks, uniforms and stationary. After studying for two years in the school, students were exempted from paying anything until their studies were over.

However, with even more students enrolling into Ahmadhiyya, congestion issues began to happen. Eventually, the government provided a plot of land that was 4000 square feet which made the total area of the school approximately 12000 square feet.

During this expansion plan, a three-story building containing 15 classrooms was constructed in the west along with another three-story building facing the south which increased the total class count to 28 classes. Existing facilities of the school were also upgraded such as a larger hall which had the capacity of fitting 300 students, two AV rooms, one fully equipped ICT lab, along with two prayer rooms, one each for boys and girls.

With the year 2014 ending, the school went through a rebranding effort, from Madhrasathul Ahmadhiyya to the now known name of Ahmadhiyya International School.

When the year 2015 came, many new career choices was introduced to the higher secondary students with three new languages brought into the syllabus, Arabic, French and Chinese. Once again, many upgrades were taking place such as air-conditioning the student hall, student classrooms and laboratories. The introduction of a brand new play set for kindergarten children along with the installation of a public announcement system on all floors.

Around late 2017 to the end of 2018, a brand new building began construction that was an extension to the kindergarten classes. When the construction of this new building was completed at the beginning of 2019, many facilities for the lower grades were given. They included a multipurpose hall, 9 more classrooms to add for the increasing number of students, and an additional prayer room to utilize the old one for 2 additional classrooms. This infrastructure also aided the school to introduce new grade classes and gain extra space sacrificing the compound area size.

== Infrastructure ==
Ahmadhiyya stands on a plot of land around 12000 square feet which is quite small compared to the land area of other schools in Maldives. Ahmadhiyya has two buildings, the western building and the southern building with the southern one being supported by a secondary building. There are two entrances made for both boys and girls respectively. The boys gate faces into the football field used by the preschool children and youths alike along with a parking lot designed to hold more than 150 motorbikes. There is a small exercise zone that is connected to the football field as well.

== Admission ==
A student planning to continue studying here must take an admission exam. Firstly, a background check is made on the student if there were any prior suspensions or expulsion activities. When clear, the student's previous three years of academic results are scanned. If the student passes through the criteria, he is given a unique index number and a class to join to. Documents on fee prices, textbooks and uniform details are also handed out.

All the grades follow the same academic year pattern.

=== Class schedule ===
School sessions in Ahmadhiyya are divided into two. There is the morning session and the afternoon session:

- The morning session takes place from 7:00 am to 12:45 pm. Students from grades 7 and 10 along with preschool children are required to attend this session.
- The afternoon session takes place from 1:00 pm to 6:10 pm. During this time, higher secondary students, kindergarten children as well as primary students are required to attend.

Ahmadhiyya students that study arts and crafts as an optional subject are required to attend those classes after the end of the morning session from 1:00 pm to 2:00 pm.

Ahmadhiyya also has established night class schedules for exam preparation and per student demand.

== Education system ==
Ahmadhiyya has a custom syllabus that is made specially for the kindergarten and preschool children up to UKG. Afterwards, it is changed to the current Maldivian Syllabus followed to Grade 7. The Cambridge International General Certificate of Secondary Education (IGCSE) is then followed in Grade 8, 9 and 10. A final exam takes places beginning at October and ending midway into November. Maldivians also have the Secondary School Certificate (SSC) Syllabus which includes the subjects Islam and Dhivehi, with Quran recently being removed from the syllabus.

After O' Level's, Edexel A' Levels are continued with a final exam conducted on the end of the year for Grade 11 and 12.

== Principals ==
Throughout 38 years of the school standing, there has been a total of six principals that have served the school.

1. Mr. Abdul Rasheed Ali, he is the first ever principal of Ahmadhiyya who served from 21 February 1982 up to 15 August 1982. He once again served the school from 23 December 1986 to 9 July 1989.
2. Mr. Copee Mohmmad Rasheed, the second principal to serve the school from 16 August 1982 to 22 December 1986.
3. Mr. Abdul Sameeu Hassan, the fourth principal to serve the school. He served from 10 July 1989 all the way to 18 May 2000. During the 11 years he served the school, Sameeu introduced the system where O' Level Examinations were provided to the Grade 10. He also introduced full-time teacher jobs. During this time of school improvements, the school was given the title of being the Most Progressive School.
4. Mr. Ahmed Saeed (sometimes known as Gahaa), the fifth principal to serve the school who served from 18 May 2000 to 29 August 2004. During his time, the school was achieving the best resulting in the Cambridge O' Level which the title still stands to this day.
5. Mr. Hassan Nashid, the sixth principal of the school who served from 9 August 2004 to 15 October 2006. He provided the fame of the school which made Ahmadhiyya inhabited with islanders from all around Maldives.
6. Mr. Mohamed Rasheed, the seventh and current principal of Ahmadhiyya, who have been serving the school since 28 October 2006 making it the longest time an individual has served the role of principal in Ahmadhiyya history. He introduced many new features such as extra classes and tuition for weaker students. Rasheed began his journey of principal by joining as a teacher right after the debut of the school. His great determination, dedication and commitment gave him the title of Assistant Principal. not long after, he was promoted to Senior Principal and finally, into his Principal role.

== Clubs and Associations ==
- HIYAA (Dhivehi Literary Association of Ahmadhiyya)
- AELA (Ahmadhiyya English Literary Association)
- Business Club
- Science Club
- Environment Club
- Art Club
- Quran Club

== Extracurricular activities ==
- Scout
- Girl Guides
- Cadet
- Band
- Prefects
