= Imaduddin School =

Primary and Secondary school in Malé, Maldives

- ޢިމާދުއްދީން ސްކޫލް

Location
- Ameenee Magu; Galolhu; Malé 20144; Maldives
- Coordinates: 4.171065°N 73.511004°E

Information
- School type: Primary and Secondary
- Motto: ޢަޒުމަކީ ކާމިޔާބީގެ ތަޅުދަނޑި (Dhivehi) (Determination is the Key to Success)
- Religious affiliation: Islam
- Founded: 5 September 2001
- Status: Active
- Principal: Ali Mamdhooh
- Teaching staff: 137 (as of 2020)
- Grades: 1-10
- Gender: Boys and Girls
- Language: Dhivehi, English
- Schedule type: Morning Session: Grades 6-10; Afternoon Session: Grades 1-5
- Hours in school day: 6
- Houses: Fenfiyaaz, Yagooth, Alimas and Ithaamui
- Color: Orange
- Website: ims.edu.mv
- Last updated: 27 July 2024

Imaduddin School is a public school located in the Galolhu, Malé in the Maldives. Imaduddin School was put up with the assistance of the Islamic Development Bank, the foundation stone was laid by the then Minister of Education, Dr. Mohamed Latheef on 26 October 1998. The school has participated and won in many inter-school competitions and regular activities. It also hosted events and celebrated international events.

== History ==
Imaduddin School was inaugurated on 5 September 2001 by the former President of Maldives, Maumoon Abdul Gayoom.

The name Imaduddin refers to Muhammad Imaduddin I who ruled the Maldives during the late 1600s. The school has almost 2000 students. Until 2009 the school taught students up to grade 7. After 2010 it also taught grades 8–10. It is the first primary school in Maldives that also has secondary classes. The school also provides education for students with special needs called "Jewel Centre".

On 9 January 2023, the school served as the temporary shelter for the expatriate workers who were impacted during the 2023 Neelan Fihaara fire. Arrangements were made to give them food and water.

On 30 August 2023, the school started an exchange program, where four students and the headmaster of Akash International School, a school in India, came to Imaduddin and Iskandhar for a week. Grade 9 students of Imaduddin also went to 3 schools in Bangalore.

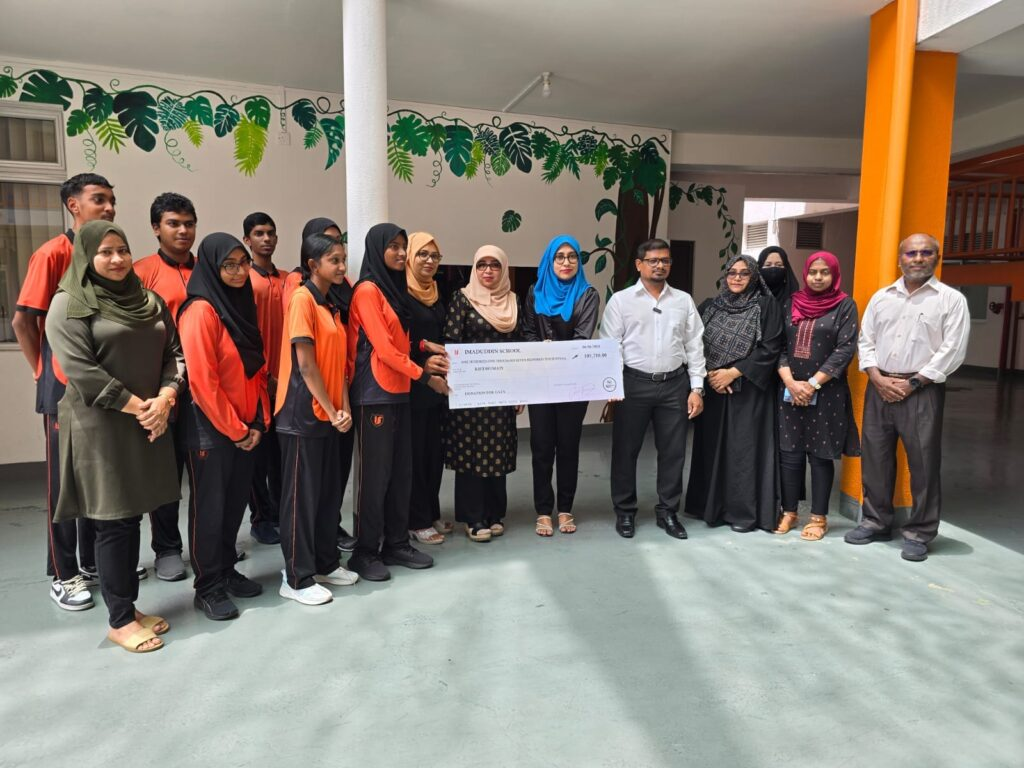
Students and Senior Management of IMS with the cheque

On 27 March 2024, the school held a fundraiser for the humanitarian aid of Palestinians during the Gaza war, which they raised Rf. 105,710 and on 4 April, the school donated all the money to Khidhumaiy, a local NGO. A special assembly was held at the school and the cheque was handed to Khidhumaiy.

=== Previous Principals of Imaduddin ===
- Mr. Abdulla Zameer (5 January 2000 to 23 May 2004)
- Ms. Juwaiyriya Ibrahim (1 August 2004 to 14 May 2006 and 26 August 2009 to 7 April 2011)
- Ms. Mausooma Ali (14 May 2006 to 26 August 2009)
- Mr. Ibrahim Asif Rasheed (23 May 2011 to 20 November 2013)
- Mr. Mohamed Shaheen (9 April 2014 to 26 September 2014)
- Ms. Wafa Waheed Mohamed (30 December 2014 to 16 June 2018)
- Mr. Ibrahim Mujahid (16 June 2018 to 11 June 2019)
- Mr. Ibrahim Shathir (4 April 2019 to 6 February 2020), he was removed by the Education Ministry after a petition was submitted by parents of students and teachers requesting his dismissal.
- Dr. Ali Mamdhooh (25 January 2021 to Present)

== Houses ==
| Alimas | Purple | Amethyst |
| Ithaamui | Blue | Sapphire |
| Yagooth | Red | Ruby |
| Fenfiyaaz | Green | Emerald |

All the students belong to a single house upon admission to the school. Each house is run by the 3 people:

- Teachers
- House Captain
- House Deputy Captain

These posts are assigned to students from grade 9-10, through the house system. Students are given the opportunity to participate in activities including sports, games and more. Inter-house tournaments in popular sports take place in the school.

== Uniform Bodies ==
Imaduddin School has a wide range of uniform bodies such as Cub Scouts, Scouts, Girl Guides, Little Maids, Cadets, Band, and Traffic Monitors for grades 6-9.

Traffic Monitors began in October 2022 for grades 6-9.

=== List of Clubs ===
- Crest and Media Club
- Coding Club
- Eureka
- Human Rights Club
- Flair Club
- Fehimala
- Adhabee Furamaraa
- Business Club
- Islam Club

== Facilities ==
| Facility | Description |
|---|---|
| Shujaee Library | The school has 2 libraries, indoor and outdoor, most commonly the indoor library is used. The library includes Dhivehi books, fiction books, non-fiction books, novels, and many more. Students can go to the library during the library period given once a week. |
| Science Laboratory | Students can use this lab during the Science period. |
| Audio Visual Room | This room provides a projector, where students can use. |
| Computer Laboratory | For computer science students to learn. |
| Sports Hall | Students can go to the Sports Hall or the school grounds to play any sport during HPE period. It's also used for sport competitions. |
| Health Room | Students can go to the health room to receive medical treatment for any injuries. |
| Therapy Room | A room located in the ground floor, used for Jewel Centre students with complex learning disabilities. It was established by the Bank of Maldives (BML). |
| Bodurasgefaanu Maalan | "Bodurasgefaanu Maalan" or more commonly known as the hall, is the main hall of the school located at the ground floor. It is commonly used in concerts, school assemblies and a place where higher grades take tests. |

== After-school activities ==
The school provides various after-school activities such as a STEM lab provided by ForLoop Coding Academy, where students can learn how to code using different programming languages such as Python and Scratch. Another being, a sports pool where interested students and coaches teaches them any sport. Examples being basketball, football, etc.
