= Kunburudhoo (Haa Dhaalu Atoll) =

- Inhabited island
- Location in Maldives
- Coordinates: 06°39′30″N 73°01′39″E
- Country: Maldives
- Geographic atoll: Thiladhummathi Atoll
- Administrative atoll: Haa Dhaalu Atoll
- Distance to Malé: 278.85 km (173.27 mi)

Population (2014)
  - Total: 0
- Time zone: UTC+05:00 (MST)

Kunburudhoo (Dhivehi: ކުނބުރުދޫ) is a formerly inhabited island of the Haa Dhaalu Atoll administrative division and geographically part of Thiladhummathi Atoll in the north of the Maldives.

The island is suffering severe land loss to the sea due to coastal erosion. During the monsoon the sand is being eroded at a greater rate than it is accreted. Plans are underway to construct a quayside and artificial reef to protect the island.

Preliminary results from the 2014 Population and Housing Census report that the island of Kunburudhoo is no longer inhabited, due in part to the threat of rising sea levels. The same publication - the revised version of which was released by the National Bureau of Statistics in March 2015 - shows a total of 85 Maldivian people living on the island in 2006. Since the government's consolidation program launched in 2009, the people of Kunburudhoo have been relocated to H Dh Nolhivaranfaru with the people of Maavaidhoo and Faridhoo of the same atoll.
