= Iskandhar School =

Kindergarten to Secondary School in Malé, Maldives

Coordinates: 4.176291°N 73.509512°E

- އިސްކަންދަރް ސްކޫލް

Location
- Chaandhanee Magu; Machchangolhi; Malé 20159; Maldives

Information
- Former names: Hameediya Montessori School; Naasiriyya Montessori School; Iskandhar Montessori School
- School type: Primary and Secondary
- Established: 10 May 1961
- Founder: Ibrahim Nasir
- Administrator: Mohamed Sobah
- Principal: Mohamed Shukury
- Deputy Principals: Fathimath Suza & Aminath Shahadha
- Houses: Isdhoo; Hura; Hilaalee; Utheemu
- Colour: Red
- Slogan: Work with freedom and enthusiasm
- Website: iskandhar.edu.mv
- Last updated: 11 January 2026

Iskandhar School is a government-run public school in Malé, Maldives. It was founded on 10 May 1961, under the name of Hameediyya Montessori School. The school currently has over 2000 students and over 130 teachers. It is one of the oldest educational institutions in the Maldives.

== History ==
Iskandhar School was established on 10 May 1961, by the former Prime Minister of the Maldives, Ibrahim Nasir, under the name Hameediyya Montessori School. Initially, the school only catered to primary students of certain grades.

The school was renamed to Naasiriyya Montessori School in 1970, following the extension of the school building and the creation of more classrooms. The first principal of the school, M. Vanculumburge, retired 4 years later, in 1974. By 1978, the school had 588 students and 18 classes. In 1979, the school was renamed to Iskandhar Montessori School.

The school was renamed to its current name, after Sultan Ibrahim Iskandhar Siri Kularanmeeba Mahaa Radhun, on 1 January 1980. In 1990, the school became a fully-fledged primary school, being able to educate students from grades 1 to 5. By 2000, the school began educating students of grades 6 and 7, and by 2010, the school also became a secondary school. The school celebrates its anniversary each year.

In 2025, the school's old building was demolished after being deemed unsafe for many years by the Ministry of Education.

The school also has been under the light of controversy by being caught cheating in enrolling students in 2019, by inappropriate sexual conduct by a leading teacher towards a student in 2022, and a leading teacher forcibly cutting of a student's hair without parent's consent in 2025.

=== Previous Principals ===
- Mrs. Vanculemburge (1961 - 1974)
- Mrs. Fathmath Hilmy (1977 - 1982)
- Ms. W. De S. G. Liyanege (1982 - 1985)
- Mrs. L. S. G. De Silva (1985 - 1991)
- Mrs. Maanaa Raafiu (1991 - 1993)
- Mr. Abdulla Ismail (1993 - 1997)
- Mr. Abdulla Zameer (1997 - 2000)
- Mr. Mohamed Rasheed (2000 - 2002)
- Mr. Mohamed Fahmy Hassan (2002 - 2003)
- Mrs. Shifa Mohamed (2004 - 2008)
- Mrs. Aishath Hanna Ahmed (2009 - 2011)
- Mr. Hussain Saeed Mohamed (2011 - 2024)

== School houses ==
The four school houses of Iskandhar School are:

Name of House	Colour	Representing
Isdhoo	Green	Isdhoo dynasty
Hura	Blue	Huraa dynasty
Hilaalee	Purple	Hilaalee dynasty
Utheemu	Pink	Utheemu dynasty

Every student of the school belongs to a single house, allocated upon admission to the school. Each house is run by a committee composed of:

- A House Supervisor
- Teachers
- A House Captain, Deputy Captain, and Activities Captain.

These posts are assigned to students from grades 8 to 10. Through the house system, pupils are given the opportunity to participate in activities including sports, games, and academic activities. Inter-house tournaments in popular sports are take place throughout the year.

== Facilities ==
Facility	Description
Library	The school library includes reference books, fiction books, non-fiction books, encyclopedias, and magazines. The use of the library is permitted during a library period given to students on certain days. It can also be used by expatriate students during Dhivehi and Islam periods.
Science Laboratory	The use of this laboratory is permitted during environmental studies and science periods.
Audio Visual Room	This room provides a TV, a Video CD player, and a DVD player.
Music Room	Students receive music classes weekly here.
Computer Laboratory/Art Room	For students studying computer science to learn and for students studying art to draw or paint. This room is fully air-conditioned.

== Extracurricular activities ==
The school carries out choir, band, and singing practices, as well as a Qur'an club. Students for music and Qur'an clubs are selected through competitions between the school houses and classes, as well as through special competitions organized specifically for the selection of the most talented students in these areas. The school music teachers select the students for band and choir.

Basketball, netball, table tennis, athletics, football, cricket, and swimming clubs are managed by associations in close collaboration with the school.

Iskandhar participates in linguistic and artistic competitions carried out nationally and internationally.

== Club activities ==
Students can choose a club based on their interest or passion. Each week, they attend one lesson where they will receive activities based on the club.

=== List of clubs ===
- Islamic Forum
- Dhivehi Literary Association
- English Literary Association
- Environment Club
- Art Club
- Human Rights Club
- Business Club
- Science Club
- Health and Fitness Club
- Coding Club
- Media Club
- Home Science Club
- Galactic Club

== Uniform bodies ==
Cub Scout and little maids (Note: Little maids is a section from the Maldives Girl Guide Association that ranges from ages 7 - 12.) programs are available in this school. Students from the second grade and onward are selected for these uniform bodies.

In 2005, the school introduced a cadet uniform body for students in grades 6 to 10.
