= List of banks in the Maldives =

- Bank of Ceylon - Malé Branch
- Bank of Maldives
- Commercial Bank of Maldives
- Maldives Islamic Bank
- The Mauritius Commercial Bank (Maldives) Private Limited
- The Hongkong and Shanghai Banking Corporation
- State Bank of India
- Habib Bank Limited
