= Goidhoo =

Goidhoo as a place name may refer to:

- Goidhoo (Baa Atoll) (Republic of Maldives)
- Goidhoo (Shaviyani Atoll) (Republic of Maldives)
