= Feydhoo =

Feydhoo may refer to the following places in the Maldives:

- Feydhoo (Addu Atoll)
- Feydhoo (Shaviyani Atoll)
