= Naushad (disambiguation) =

Naushad is an Indian composer. I may also refer to:

- Naushad Alam, Indian politician
- Naushad Ali (cricketer), Pakistani cricketer
- Naushad Waheed, Maldivian cartonist
- Naushad Siddiqui, Indian politician
