= Fathimath =

Fathimath (Dhivehi: ފާތިމަތު) is a given name and a surname. Notable people with the name include:

== Given name ==
- Fathimath Azifa (born 1988), Maldivian actress
- Fathimath Dheema Ali (born 2007), Maldivian table tennis player
- Fathimath Dhiyana Saeed (born 1974), Maldivian diplomat
- Fathimath Fareela (born 1984), Maldivian actress
- Fathimath Ibrahim Didi (1918–2008), Maldivian royal family member
- Fathimath Latheefa, Maldivian actress
- Fathimath Nabaaha Abdul Razzaq (born 1999), Maldivian badminton player
- Fathimath Nahula (born 1973), Maldivian film director and screenwriter
- Fathimath Rauf (born 1959), Maldivian singer
- Fathimath Sara Adam (born 2000), Maldivian actress
- Fathimath Shafeega (born 1963), Maldivian CEO
- Fathimath Zoona (born 1965), Maldivian singer

== Surname ==
- Fariha Fathimath (born 1987), Maldivian swimmer

== See also ==
- Fatima (given name)
