= Firunbaidhoo =

- uninhabited island
- Location in Maldives
- Coordinates: 06°09′N 73°13′E
- Country: Maldives
- Geographic atoll: Miladhummadulhu Atoll
- Administrative atoll: Shaviyani Atoll
- Distance to Malé: 216.91 km (134.78 mi)

Government
  - Island Chief: none

Dimensions
  - Length: 0.520 km (0.323 mi)
  - Width: 0.430 km (0.267 mi)

Population (217 in 2004)
  - Total: 0
- Time zone: UTC+05:00 (MST)

Firunbaidhoo is an uninhabited island of Shaviyani Atoll, Maldives.

== History ==
Before 1977, Firunbaidhoo was relatively highly developed with a population of around 720. However, 26 families searching for greater economic and social opportunities were resettled on December 1st of that year; this was followed by a resettlement of 20 and then 51 other families, totaling 526 people in all. The diaspora resulted in a decline of health, education and electricity services on the island.

Government intervention due to economic difficulties on the island led to the resettlement of 97 homes (as well as 16 from Maakandoodhoo) to the capital of the atoll, Funadhoo, which cost 33.4 million rufiyaa.

In December 2001, 25 homes still remained unlocated on the island, including that of its chief, Ahmed Naseem. A 2007 population consolidation program further relocated the populus in Firunbaidhoo to Funadhoo. The island is now unpopulated.

On January 27, 2015, Abdulla Maail went missing from Firunbaidhoo, where he was working as an agricultural worker. The police responsible for the case faced controversy regarding extensive response time, lack of contact, and accusations of negligence. In December of 2018, Chairperson of the Commission Husnu Suood stated that Maail's disapperance was one of the 24 cases being investigated.

== Environment ==
Like many of the islands in the Shaviyani Atoll, Firunbaidhoo is home to mangroves.

The soft coral in the waters around Firunbaidhoo are home to a variety of marine life including grey reef sharks, Humphead wrasses, Hawksbill sea turtles, trevally, barracuda, batfish, moray eels, leaf scorpionfish, and nudibranchs.
