= Malé English School =

Defunct private school in Malé, Maldives

- މާލޭ އިންގްލިޝް ސުކޫލް

Location
- Machchangolhi; Malé, Kaafu Atoll; Maldives
- Coordinates: 4.170225°N 73.509218°E

Information
- School type: Private Secondary
- Motto: Wake and Awake
- Founded: 10 April 1977
- Founder: Ahmed Zahir and Hussain Shibab
- Status: Closed
- Colours: Red and Blue
- Website: mes.edu.mv (archived)
- Last updated: 26 September 2024

Malé English School (MES) was a private school in Malé, the capital of the Maldives. MES was established on 10 April 1977 and founded by Ahmed Zahir and Hussain Shihab. When it first opened, the school had 60 students and 2 permanent teachers. In 1998, the school had over 2000 students and 60 teachers. Ali Musthafa became the principal in 1978. The school had received many achievements in singing, music, literature and sports.

This school is no longer functioning. The Ministry of Education assigned the old MES building to Izzudheen School.

== Uniform Bodies ==
=== Cadet ===
Cadet activities began at the school on 17 May 1992. MES Cadets took part in national level celebrations as well as participating in training camps organized by the NSS. After the Maldives National Cadet Corps was founded, MES Cadets found their way into officer ranks of the MNCC.

=== Brass Band ===
Brass Band started on 18 May 1990 after the instruments were received under the auspice of former president, Maumoon Abdul Gayoom. During the end of 1994, more band instruments were received and new heights were achieved.

=== Scouting ===
In MES, Scouting began on 26 August 1983 under the name of the "Second Malé Scout Group". MES Scouts had received numerous training from the courses run to train assistant patrol leaders as well as a number of training camps. MES Scouts had participated in the 1994 Pakistan National Jumboree in Koitar as well the Fourth International Adventure held in Panchmadhi of Madhya Pradesh, India. Ahmed Nasheed was incharge of Scouting at MES.

=== Girl Guides ===
Girl Guide activities started at MES on 12 October 1983 as the "Second Malé Girl Guides". Several camps have been held to promote girl guide activity. MES Guides had attended training programmes overseas such as the one held in Kuching of Sarawak, Malaysia in 2000. Fathimath Nihad and Sausan Saeed were incharge of Girl Guide activities.

=== Adhabee Busthaan (Literary Association) ===
Ever since its inception in 1980, this association has been producing orators, poets and writers of outstanding calibre. The president was Muhammad Widad, Amin Ibrahim as Chief Coordination and Abdulla Amin as assistant coordinators.

=== Society for Environmental Awareness (SEA) ===
This society was officially inaugurated by Hussain Shihab, who was the then Director of Environment at the Ministry of Planning and Environment, and the former Permanent Representative of the Maldives to the UN.

=== MES Prefects ===
Prefects of MES were selected on the basis of merit and prominence in co-curricular activities. The first prefects were appointed on 9 September 1980. The first captain of MES was Amina Afeef. This honor was conferred on her in 1987.
