= Hulhudhuffaaru =

Hulhudhuffaaru ހުޅުދުއްފާރު
- Inhabited island
- Location in Maldives
- Coordinates: 05°45′50″N 73°00′45″E
- Country: Maldives
- Administrative atoll: Raa Atoll
- Distance to Malé: 184.1 km (114.4 mi)

Area
  - Total: 0.602 km^{2} (0.232 sq mi)

Dimensions
  - Length: 1.625 km (1.010 mi)
  - Width: 0.450 km (0.280 mi)

Population (2022)
  - Total: 1,228
  - Density: 2,040/km^{2} (5,280/sq mi)
- Time zone: UTC+05:00 (MST)

Hulhudhuffaaru (Dhivehi: ހުޅުދުއްފާރު) is one of the inhabited islands of Raa Atoll. Hulhudhuffaaru was an uninhabited island until 1995 when it was officially declared as inhabited after relocating the people of two other smaller islands in Raa Atoll - Ungulu and Undoodhoo - to this island.

== History ==
Historical evidences from the island suggest that people have lived in the island at some time in the history. Remains of human skull are still being found in many places in the island while digging. Remarkably, like most islands in the Maldives, there is also a “ziyaaraaiy” or a tomb of a respected person adding more to the evidences that the island was inhabited. Nothing much is known, however, about the person in the tomb.

=== Inhabitation ===
Under a government-financed project, the people left their former islands with the hope of better basic facilities such as education and health care, harbor, etc. when they move to a bigger island with a bigger population than before. The residents of the islands of Ungulu and Undoodhoo were given funds by the government after estimating the value of their properties in their former islands. The people then built their homes in Hulhudhuffaru on their own.

People started moving to the island in the early 1990s, until the entire communities of both Ungulu and Undoodhoo were completely relocated. Hulhudhuffaru was officially declared as inhabited on 13 March 1995 by President Maumoon Abdul Gayoom on a visit to the island.

That day, unusually, a small protest was held on the island by islanders, who destroyed a display board in the island office, set up by government officials, purportedly praising the government and saying that the islanders were satisfied with the project. The "testimonials" on the board outraged many who felt that they were not compensated fully for their property and were not provided what they were promised.

=== Aftermath of the 2004 tsunami ===
The disastrous tsunami of December 2004 that hit the Maldives devastated Kandholhudhoo island in Raa Atoll. As a result, the residents of Kandholhudhoo were forced to seek shelter in other islands, Hulhudhufaaru being one of them. Hence even though the tsunami did not have a direct impact on the island, it has had enormous indirect impact on the island community. 5 November 2005 saw disturbances between the communities of the displaced residents of Kandholhudhoo and the Hulhudhuffaaru island community. The disturbances left injuries to some people, and significant damages to public and private property. Since then, security personnel were present in the island until the displaced people were relocated to Dhuvaafaru Island.

== Geography ==
The island is 184.1 km (114 mi; 99 nmi) north of the country's capital, Malé.

== Demography ==
Historical population
Year	Pop.	±%
2006	1,516	—
2014	1,103	−27.2%
2022	1,228	+11.3%
2006-2022: Census populations Source:

== Healthcare ==
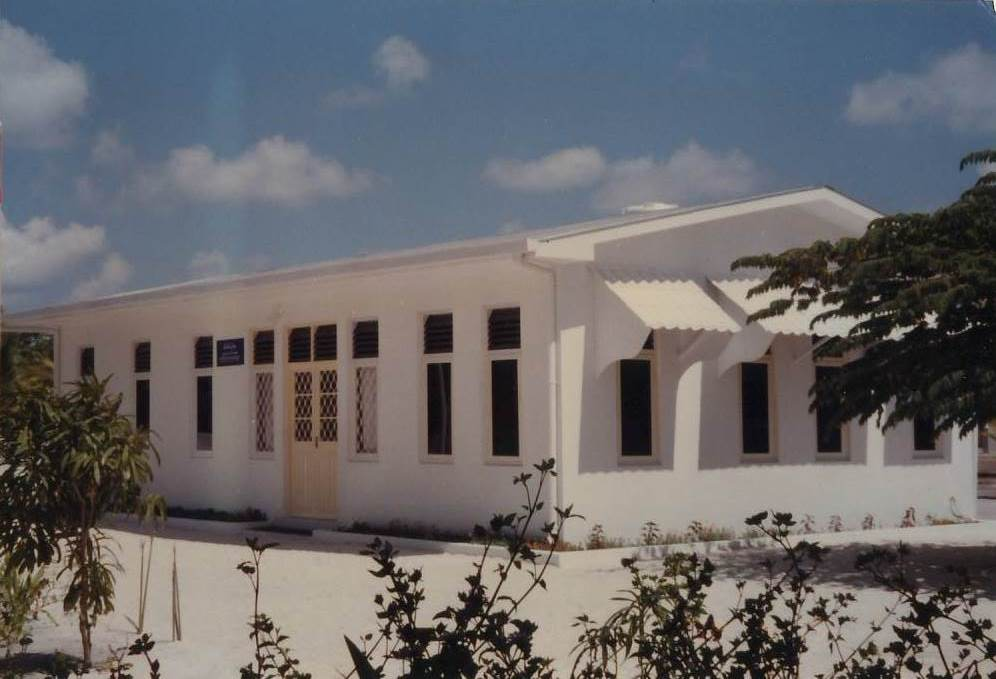
The Hulhudhuffaru Health centre has been providing primary healthcare since 1995.

The Hulhudhuffaru Health centre has been providing primary healthcare since 1995. It caters for the island people as well as patients from nearby islands like Angolhitheemu and Faarafushi. There are a total of 21 personnel, 10 in administration (all locals), 9 nursing staff (4 are expatriates and 5 locals) and 2 expatriate doctors. The health centre is working 24hours and provides basic health facilities such as OPD/IPD, Nebulization, Minor Surgery, Dressing & Injections, Growth Monitoring, Immunization, Family Planning Service, Antenatal & Postnatal Clinic, Laboratory service, Home Visits and Ambulance service.
