= Hoandeddhoo =

- Inhabited island
- Location in Maldives
- Coordinates: 00°26′45″N 73°00′15″E
- Country: Maldives
- Administrative atoll: Gaafu Dhaalu Atoll
- Distance to Malé: 416.19 km (258.61 mi)

Dimensions
  - Length: 1.800 km (1.118 mi)
  - Width: 1.000 km (0.621 mi)

Population (2014)
  - Total: 861 (including foreigners)
- Time zone: UTC+05:00 (MST)

Hoandedhdhoo (Dhivehi: ހޯނޑެއްދޫ) is one of the inhabited islands of Gaafu Dhaalu Atoll.

== Geography ==
The island is 416.19 km (259 mi; 225 nmi) south of the country's capital, Malé.

== Demography ==
Historical population
Year	Pop.	±%
2006	668	—
2020	803	+20.2%
2006-2014: Census populations Source:

The island has a population of 1,275.

== Governance ==
Hoandedhdhoo has an independent council which is responsible of managing the needs of the people of Hoandedhdhoo. The first elect councilors of Hoandedhdhoo council are Mohamed Ashraaf (President), Mohamed Ayaaz, Mohamed Shiraan, Hasma Hassan Manik (Vice President) and Mohamed Saeed. The second elect council (2014–2017) members are Mihamed Shiraan (President), Ahmed Mahudhee (Vice President), Hussain Fayaz, Hussain Firshan, Rifshan Ahmed Saeed.
