= Maavaidhoo =

Maavaidhoo މާވައިދޫ
- Inhabited island
- Location in Maldives
- Coordinates: 06°30′55″N 73°03′04″E
- Country: Maldives
- Geographic atoll: Thiladhummathi Atoll
- Administrative atoll: Haa Dhaalu Atoll
- Distance to Malé: 262.67 km (163.22 mi)

Government
  - Island Chief: Abdur-Rahman Moosa

Dimensions
  - Length: 0.870 km (0.541 mi)
  - Width: 0.600 km (0.373 mi)

Population
  - Total: 525
- Time zone: UTC+05:00 (MST)

Maavaidhoo (Dhivehi: މާވައިދޫ) was one of the inhabited islands of Haa Dhaalu Atoll administrative division and geographically part of Thiladhummathi Atoll in the north of the Maldives. The island is no longer inhabited as its citizens were migrated to Nolhivaranfaru.

The island was severely damaged by the great cyclone of 1821 that hit the northern atolls of the Maldives.
