= Ithaa =

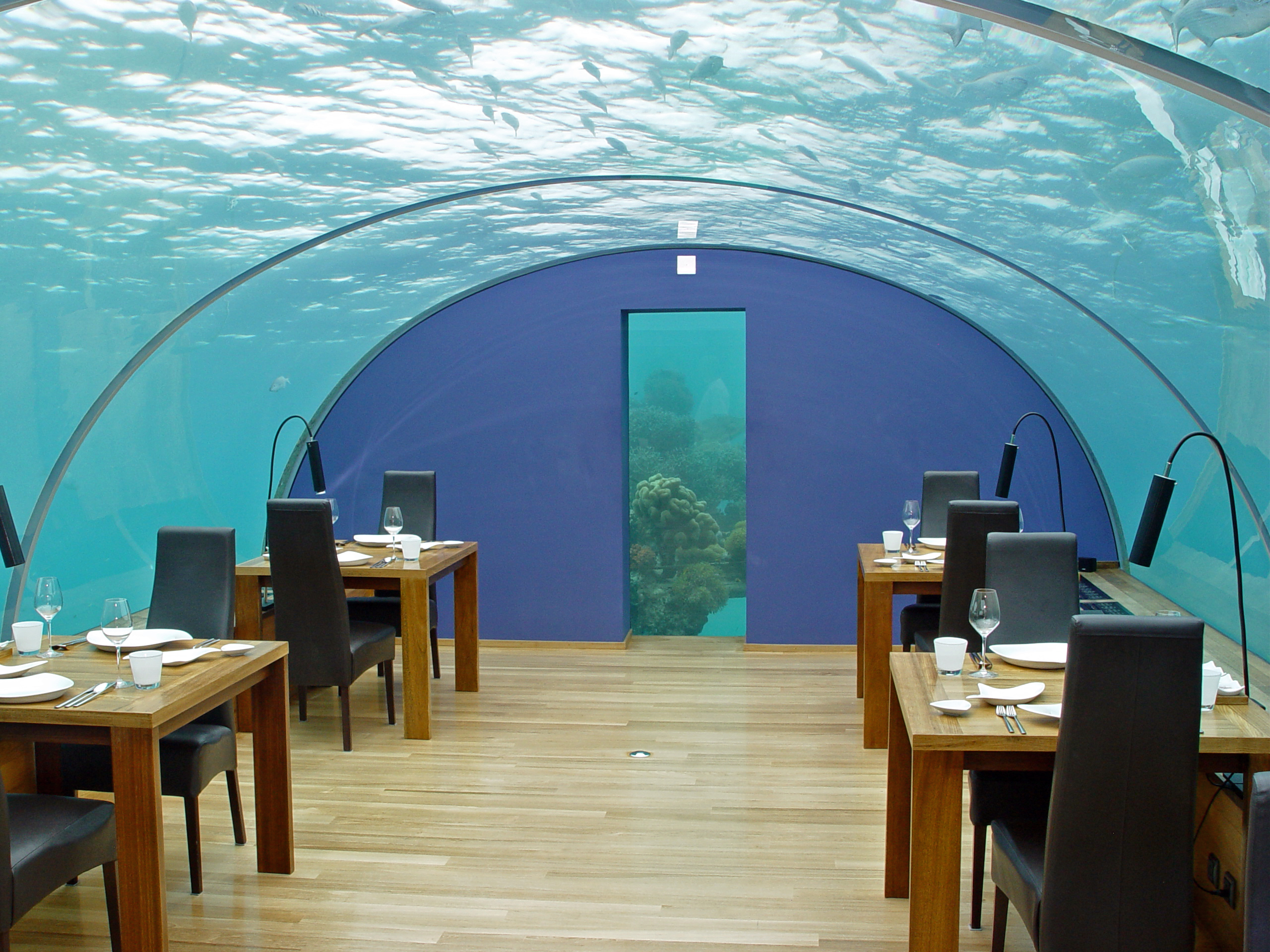
- Inside the restaurant

- Location of Ithaa in the Maldives

Restaurant information
- Established: November 19, 2004
- Owner: Conrad Hotels
- Food type: Maldivian-Western fusion cuisine
- Dress code: Semi-formal
- Location: Rangali Island, Alif Dhaal Atoll, Maldives
- Coordinates: 3°36′56″N 72°43′26″E
- Seating capacity: 14 (Dinner priced at US$400 per person)
- Website: Official website

Ithaa (Dhivehi: އިތާ, meaning "mother of pearl") is an undersea restaurant located 5 metres (16 ft) below sea level at the Conrad Maldives Rangali Island in Alif Dhaal Atoll in the Republic of Maldives.

== Overview ==
The 5-by-9-metre (16 by 30 ft) mostly acrylic structure has a capacity of 14 people and is encased in R-Cast acrylic with a transparent roof offering a 270° panoramic underwater view. The restaurant was designed and constructed by M.J. Murphy Ltd – a design consultancy based in New Zealand – and was opened on in April 2005, describing itself as the world's first undersea restaurant. Food served in the restaurant has changed over the years and has more recently been described as contemporary European with Asian influences.

Ithaa's entrance is a spiral staircase in a thatched pavilion at the end of a jetty. The tsunami which followed the 2004 Indian Ocean earthquake topped at 0.31 metres (1 ft 0 in) below the staircase entrance, and caused no damage to the restaurant.

The restaurant is also used for private parties and weddings. In April 2010, to celebrate Ithaa's 5th anniversary, the restaurant could be booked as an overnight residence. This "underwater suite" promotion continued until April 2011.

== Conception ==
In February 2004, M.J. Murphy Ltd. was approached by Crown Company in the Maldives to make a unique underwater restaurant. The Crown Company, owner of Rangali Island, leases the island to Conrad Maldives Rangali Island (previously known as Hilton Maldives Rangali Island Resort & Spa). Initially Crown envisioned the underwater restaurant with straight walls and glass windows. Later they came to favor Mike Murphy's (of M.J. Murphy Ltd.) R-Cast acrylic tunnel, manufactured by Reynolds Polymer Technology, Inc. in the United States. This tunnel was also designed for the Kuala Lumpur National Science Centre, the world's largest aquarium tunnel.

Work on technical designs and drawings for Ithaa started in March 2004. Murphy initially planned to build the structure on the beach of Rangali. Once constructed, Ithaa would be winched into the water. Technical challenges, limited resources, and quality control problems in building a structure of 175 tonnes in the Maldives were foreseen. Hence, a decision was made to build Ithaa in Singapore instead.

== Construction ==
In May 2004, Ithaa's construction began in Singapore. In October 2004, the construction work was completed including the installation of 5-metre (16 ft) wide acrylic arches, air conditioning and electrical ducts.

On November 1, 2004, Ithaa was lifted onto an ocean-going barge to be transported to the Maldives, which took 16 days to arrive. At this point, Ithaa weighed 175 tonnes.

On November 19, 2004, Ithaa was "sunk" with the help of 85 tonnes of sand ballast loaded into its belly. It was precisely maneuvered onto four steel piles which had been vibro-hammered 4 to 5 metres (13 to 16 ft) into the seabed. It was then secured to the steel piles with concrete.

The estimated life span of the restaurant is 20 years, concluding in the mid-2020s.

== The hotel ==
The hotel (which at the time Ithaa was built was still called Hilton Maldives Resort & Spa) occupies two private islands, Rangali and Rangalifinolhu joined by a 500-metre (1,600 ft) jetty. It has seven restaurants including the Ithaa Undersea Restaurant.
