= 12 Blues =

Private island in the Maldives

Coordinates: 5.644°N 72.987°E

12 Blues is a 10-acre private island located in the Maldives archipelago. This island is 90 miles north of Male and accessible by a 35-minute sea plane journey. 12 Blues is also the world's first hotel residences offered for sale by the government of the Maldives. On 11 October 2011, the President of the Republic of Maldives Mohamed Nasheed attended the groundbreaking of the 12 Blues, confirming the government's support for foreign investment in the Islands. The hotel residences were expected to open in 2012.
