= Economic aid to the Maldives =

Before the 1980s, the Maldives received limited assistance from UN specialised agencies. Much of the external help came from Arab countries such as Saudi Arabia, Kuwait, and the UAE, for use on an ad hoc basis rather than as part of comprehensive development plan. However, with the developmental commitment of President Maumoon Abdul Gayyoom, who assumed office in 1978, Maldives received an annual average of US$15.5 million in external assistance in the form of grants and loans from SAARC to Maldives.

In 1992, Maldives received approximately US$11.6 million in foreign aid from international agencies such as the World Bank, Asian Development Bank and individual countries, particularly Japan. Other than humanitarian aid, loans and grants went for such purposes as education, health, transport, fisheries, and harbour development. The Maldives currently owes more than 35% of its debt to Chinese investors. The challenge with the Maldives' outlook is that it is developing too much too quickly, and the small island nation is vulnerable to China's formidable financial power. There is lack of economic capacity to compete.

The United Nations Development Programme is providing support to the Maldives for environmental projects.

== Debt growth ==
Debt – external: estimated per cent of GDP

2014 – 56.2%
2015 – 55.1%
2016 – 60.3%
2017 – 64.4%
2018 – 66.2%
2019 – 66.9%
