= Feydhoo (Shaviyani Atoll) =

Feydhoo ފޭދޫ
- Inhabited island
- Location in Maldives
- Coordinates: 06°21′37″N 73°02′51″E
- Country: Maldives
- Geographic atoll: Miladhummadulhu Atoll
- Administrative atoll: Shaviyani Atoll
- Distance to Malé: 246.98 km (153.47 mi)

Dimensions
  - Length: 1.170 km (0.727 mi)
  - Width: 0.900 km (0.559 mi)

Population (2026)https://www.feydhoo.gov.mv/about
  - Total: 1,370
- Time zone: UTC+05:00 (MST)

Feydhoo (Dhivehi: ފޭދޫ) is one of the inhabited islands of the Shaviyani Atoll administrative division that is geographically part of the Miladhummadulhu Atoll in the Maldives. Feydhoo is located in the centre of the atoll between the channel called Noomara Kandu and the island Bileffahi.

== History ==
Feydhoo was severely damaged during the cyclone of 1821 that hit the northern atolls of the Maldives. This was during the reign of Sultan Muhammad Mueenuddeen I.

There are accounts suggesting the island was once abandoned during heavy rains (locally referred to as Keylakunu rains) and later resettled, with some remnants of human habitation found in uninhabited areas.

== Geography and Environment ==
The island is 246.98 km (153 mi; 133 nmi) north of the country's capital Malé.

It lies centrally within Shaviyani Atoll, between Noomara Kandu channel and the neighboring island of Bileffahi.

The total land area is approximately 94 hectares (0.94 km²) and includes wetland ecosystems with mangroves and coastal flora.

A significant portion of Shaviyani Feydhoo encompasses diverse wetland ecosystems, featuring mangroves and Kandoofas. These ecosystems thrive with mangrove apples and other trees typical of wetlands. While a once-thriving cluster of mangrove apple trees near the port fell victim to the devastation of a tsunami, a beautiful mangrove on the north side of the island remains a popular attraction for visitors.

The “Dhorunaaveli” square, developed at the beachside by the womenfolk, is an area frequented by island visitors and locals alike. Additionally, a duck pond is in the developmental stages on the southwest side.

== Demographics, Community and Economy ==
Historical population
Year	Pop.	±%
2006	695	—
2014	723	+4.0%
2022	854	+18.1%
2006-2014-2022: Census populations Source:

- Population (2022): ~854 residents (increase from 741 in 2014).
- The community is predominantly Dhivehi-speaking and rooted in Islamic culture and traditions.
- The island exhibits strong community engagement, with notable participation in local sports and cultural activities.

Language & Culture

- Daily life is influenced by traditional Maldivian customs, and the local dialect and lifestyle reflect the northern Maldivian island culture.

Economy & Livelihoods

The island’s economy is primarily community-oriented and mixed:

- Fishing and reef fishing remain important traditional occupations.
- Many residents work in government jobs and the local tourism sector.
- Home-based businesses include sewing, cake-making, handicrafts, and weaving—often driven by women’s groups.
- Small-scale commerce and services support daily economic activity.

Transport & Access

- Visitors typically reach Feydhoo by speedboat or ferry from Funadhoo Domestic Airport, the nearest regional airport.
- Internal transport comprises local boats and inter-island services common in northern atolls.
