= Feevah =

Feevah ފީވައް
- Inhabited island
- Location in Maldives
- Coordinates: 06°20′57″N 73°12′28″E
- Country: Maldives
- Geographic atoll: Miladhummadulhu Atoll
- Administrative atoll: Shaviyani Atoll
- Distance to Malé: 241.24 km (149.90 mi)

Dimensions
  - Length: 1.200 km (0.746 mi)
  - Width: 0.920 km (0.572 mi)

Population (2022)
  - Total: 694
- Time zone: UTC+05:00 (MST)

Feevah (Dhivehi: ފީވައް) is one of the inhabited islands of Shaviyani Atoll administrative and geographically part of the Miladhummadulhu Atoll in the Maldives.

== History ==
The island has had its fair share of natural disasters. Feevah was the southernmost island which was affected by the August 1815 earthquakes that shook the northernmost islands of the Maldives. The island was later severely damaged by the great cyclone of 1821. In modern history, the Boxing Day Tsunami of 2004 damaged the island and has affected agriculture on the island- the main occupation of its inhabitants.

== Geography ==
The island is 242.7 km (151 mi; 131 nmi) north of the country's capital, Malé.

== Demography ==
Historical population
Year	Pop.	±%
2006	746	—
2014	613	−17.8%
2022	694	+13.2%
2006-2014-2022: Census populations Source:
