= Gaadhoo =

- Inhabited island
- Location in Maldives
- Coordinates: 01°49′12″N 73°27′05″E
- Country: Maldives
- Administrative atoll: Laamu Atoll
- Distance to Malé: 260.52 km (161.88 mi)

Dimensions
  - Length: 1.950 km (1.212 mi)
  - Width: 1.100 km (0.684 mi)

Population (2014)
  - Total: 178 (including foreigners)
- Time zone: UTC+05:00 (MST)

Gaadhoo (Dhivehi: ގާދޫ) is a formerly inhabited island of Laamu Atoll.

== Geography ==
The island is 260.52 km (162 mi; 141 nmi) south of the country's capital, Malé.

== Demography ==
Historical population
Year	Pop.	±%
2006	231	—
2014	174	−24.7%
2006-2014: Census populations Source:
