= Trade unions in Maldives =

- National organization(s): Maldives Trade Union Congress
- Regulatory authority: Labour Relations Authority
- Primary legislation: Employment Act (2/2008)

International Labour Organization
- Maldives is a member of the ILO

Convention ratification
- Freedom of Association: 4 January 2013
- Right to Organise: 4 January 2013

Until 2008 trade unions were not allowed in the Maldives, however with the passing of the Employment Act (2008) and the ratification of a new constitution, trade union rights (including the right to strike) were formalised. The changes in the legal structure were the result of the labour movements involvement in the democratic struggles for change in the formerly single-party ruled state.

During 2008 the Tourism Employees Association of Maldives (TEAM) emerged as possibly the first trade union in the country.

Maldives has applied to be a member of the International Labour Organization (ILO) and has officially accepted the obligations of the Constitution of the ILO.
