= Hithaadhoo (Baa Atoll) =

Hithaadhoo ހިތާދޫ
- Inhabited island
- Location in Maldives
- Coordinates: 05°00′28″N 72°55′19″E
- Country: Maldives
- Administrative atoll: Baa Atoll
- Distance to Malé: 112.77 km (70.07 mi)

Government
  - Island Chief: Councilars

Area
  - Total: 0.392 km^{2} (0.151 sq mi)

Dimensions
  - Length: 0.800 km (0.497 mi)
  - Width: 0.490 km (0.304 mi)

Population (2022)
  - Total: 744
  - Density: 1,900/km^{2} (4,920/sq mi)
- Time zone: UTC+05:00 (MST)

Hithaadhoo (Dhivehi: ހިތާދޫ) is one of the inhabited islands and third largest island with registered population of 1430 in Baa Atoll.

== Geography ==
The island is 112.77 km (70 mi; 61 nmi) northwest of the country's capital, Malé.

== Demography ==
Historical population
Year	Pop.	±%
2006	758	—
2014	670	−11.6%
2022	744	+11.0%
2006-2022: Census populations Source:
