= Ghiyasuddin International School =

Public-private school in Malé, Maldives

- ޣިޔާޘުއްދީން އިންޓަނޭޝަނަލް ސުކޫލް
- Official Logo

Location
- Ameenee Magu; Machchangolhi; Malé, Kaafu Atoll; Maldives

Information
- School type: 1-10 school (co-education)
- Motto: Learn and Lead
- Founded: 2010
- Principal: Thoha Saleem
- Deputy Principals: Shirmeena Faheem and Ahmeema Abdul Ghafoor
- Houses: Ihaa, Nirolhu, Bonthi & Ethuma
- Colours: Purple & Orange
- Website: gis.edu.mv
- Last updated: 12 September 2024

Ghiyasuddin International School is the first public-private school opened in Malé, the capital of the Maldives. The school building was constructed with Japanese aid, and began operating in 1999, as Ghiyasuddin School. In the year 2009, Ghiyasuddin School was privatized and renamed Ghiyasuddin International School.

The school is named after Muhammed Ghiya'as ud-din, who became Sultan in 1766 and is known for introducing breadfruit to the country.

== History ==
Ghiyasuddin International opened on 7 February 1999 as Ghiyasuddin School. Ghiyasuddin School was the sixth primary school to be opened in Malé. The school was funded and constructed with the aid of the Japanese government. Even though the school had started operating, the construction was finished one month later, on 14 March. The school was inaugurated on 9 June 1999 by the then president Maumoon Abdul Gayyoom.

On 4 November 2009, The Maldivian Government signed an agreement with Shri Educare Ltd to privatize the school. It was the first school to be privatized under the government's privatization policy. With the agreement, the school was renamed as "Ghiyasuddin International School". On 8 January 2010, Ghiyasuddin International was officially inaugurated by President of the Maldives, Mohamed Nasheed.
