= Imad Latheef =

Maldivian journalist, columnist and a commentator

Imad H. Latheef (Dhivehi: ޢިމާދު ލަޠީފް; born 27 October 1966), is a Maldivian journalist, columnist and a commentator. He was the foreign news editor, in Haveeru newspaper in Maldives.

== Early and personal life ==
Latheef was born in the island of Meedhoo in Addu atoll. He married Siyana Shafeeq in 1985. In 1990 the couple sought a divorce. The following year he married Aminath Saeed, with whom he had a son and a daughter. Latheef lives with his wife and children in Male'.

== Genealogy ==
His father Hassan Latheef is the son of Mohamed Didi son of Abdullah Didi son of Ibrahim Manikufaan son of Mohamed Manikufaan (also known as Meedhoo Rahaa) son of Husain Manikufaan son of Prince Ibrahim Manikufan son of Sultan Hassan X son of Sultan Ali VII of Royal Isdhoo Dynasty of Maldives.

His mother Wadheefa Ibrahim Didi is the daughter of Ibrahim Didi, son of Abdullah Didi, son of An-naib Ibrahim Didi, son of An-naib Hassan Didi, son of An-nabeela Aishath Didi (also known as Dhorhee Didi), daughter of Prince Ibrahim (Abdulla) Faamuladheyri Kilegefan, son of Sultan Muhammad Ghiyasuddin, son of Sultan Ibrahim Iskandar II, son of Sultan Muzaffar Muhammad Imaduddin II of Royal Dhiyamigili dynasty of Maldives.

== Educational background ==
Latheef began his education at Malé English School, Malé. Later he joined Majeediyya School where he did his secondary education. But he dropped out without completing his secondary education.

== Career as a journalist ==
In 1992 Latheef joined Haveeru Daily as a specialised writer on international affairs and international sports; currently, he is foreign news editor and a staff columnist. In 1994, he joined Television Maldives as a sports contributor, presenter and political commentator. Latheef was also a weekly commentator on the National radio from 1994 to 2005. Imad resigned from Haveeru in late 2008, assuming the position of Head of news department in a local television station known as VTV. He is currently a reviewer for Raajje mv.

== Awards ==
- Recipient of the National literature award for distinguished writing in 1999.
