= Hirimaradhoo =

Hirimaradhoo ހިރިމަރަދޫ
- Inhabited island
- Location in Maldives
- Coordinates: 06°43′34″N 73°01′19″E
- Country: Maldives
- Geographic atoll: Thiladhummathi Atoll
- Administrative atoll: Haa Dhaalu Atoll
- Distance to Malé: 287.2 km (178.5 mi)

Dimensions
  - Length: 1.050 km (0.652 mi)
  - Width: 0.560 km (0.348 mi)

Population (2022)
  - Total: 293
- Time zone: UTC+05:00 (MST)

Hirimaradhoo (Dhivehi: ހިރިމަރަދޫ) is one of the inhabited islands of Haa Dhaalu Atoll administrative division and geographically part of Thiladhummathi Atoll in the north of the Maldives.

== Geography ==
The island is 287.2 km (178 mi; 155 nmi) north of the country's capital, Malé.

=== Ecology ===
The reefs around the island is home to manta rays, reef sharks, sea turtles and an impressive amount and variety of fish. Hirimaradhoo Thila is the best-known spot for observing Rhinobatids or guitar sharks.

== Demography ==
Historical population
Year	Pop.	±%
2006	351	—
2014	315	−10.3%
2022	293	−7.0%
2006-2014-2022: Census populations Source:

== Governance ==
Hirimaradhoo was involved in the alleged 1994 parliamentary election fraud in the Maldives where 50 votes were forged.
