= Hithadhoo (Laamu Atoll) =

- Inhabited island
- Location in Maldives
- Coordinates: 01°48′00″N 73°23′18″E
- Country: Maldives
- Administrative atoll: Laamu Atoll
- Distance to Malé: 262.99 km (163.41 mi)

Dimensions
  - Length: 2.170 km (1.348 mi)
  - Width: 1.120 km (0.696 mi)

Population (2022)
  - Total: 1,108 (including foreigners)
- Time zone: UTC+05:00 (MST)

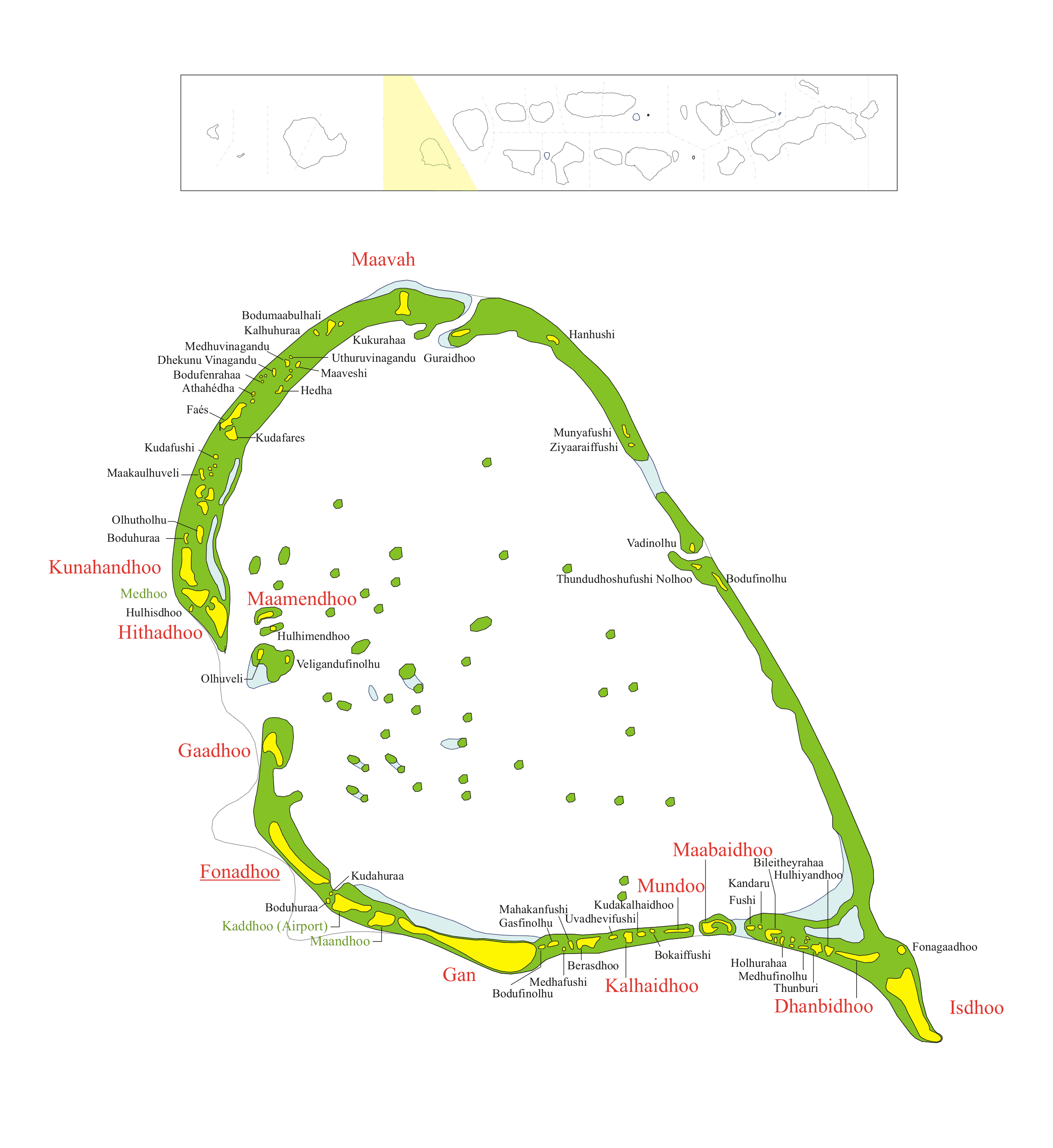
Laamu Atoll

Hithadhoo (Dhivehi: ހިތަދޫ) is one of the inhabited islands of Laamu Atoll.

== Geography ==
The island is 262.99 km (163 mi; 142 nmi) south of the country's capital, Malé.

== Demography ==
Historical population
Year	Pop.	±%
2006	836	—
2014	990	+18.4%
2022	1,108	+11.9%
2006-2022: Census populations Source:

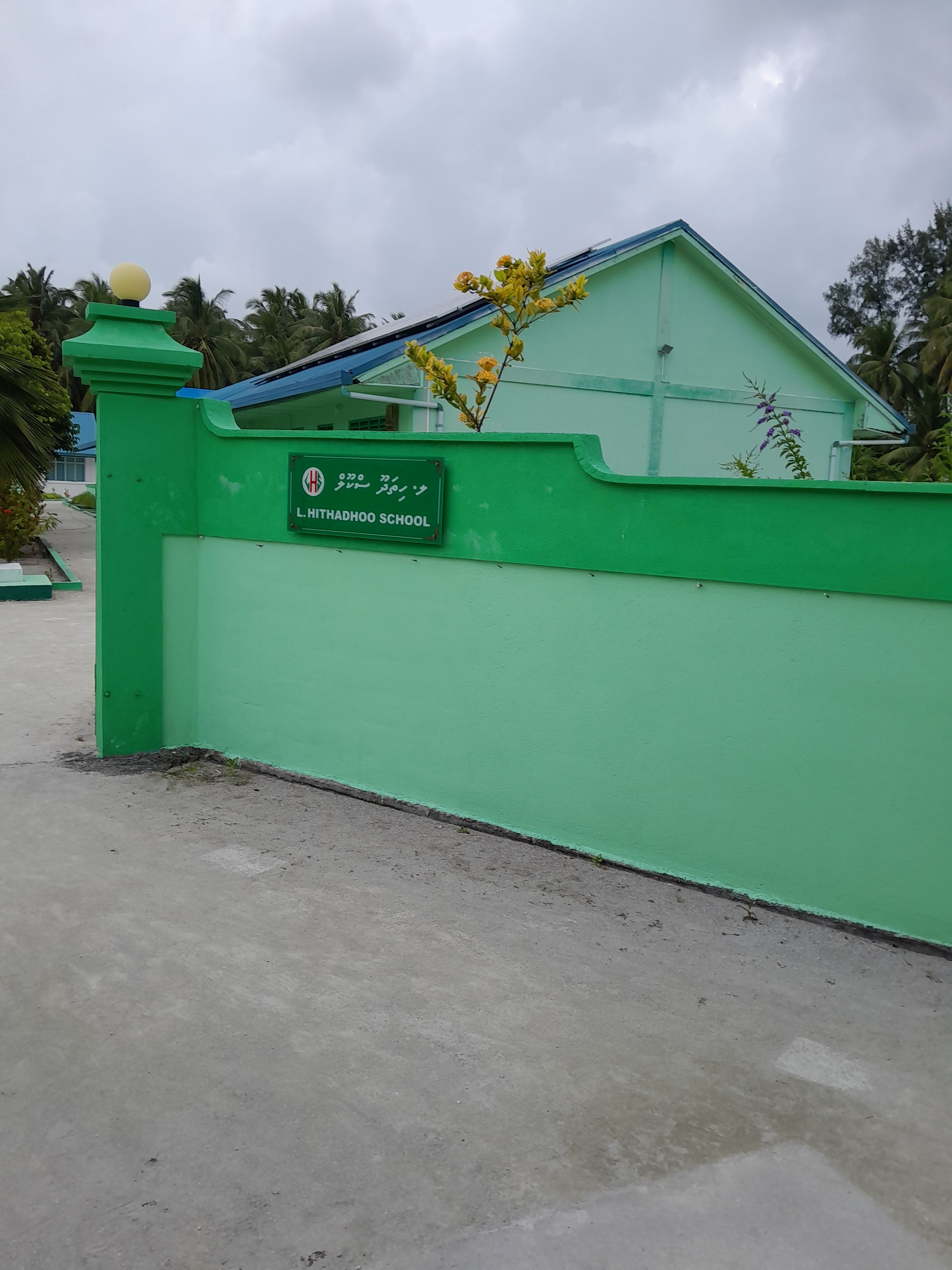
Hithadhoo School
