= The Group SC =

- Full name: The Group Sports Club
- Nickname: Group
- Founded: N/A
- Ground: Galolhu Stadium, Maldives
- Capacity: 12,000
- Chairman: (Maldives) Hussain Mohamed
- Manager: (Maldives) Mohamed Nasif
- 2006: Dhivehi League, 2nd
Home colours	Away colours

The Group Sports Club is a Maldivian basketball team.

== Achievements ==
- 2007 : 15th, MBA Championship

Men's Division 1 Runner-up

- 2007 : 15th, MBA Championship

Women's Division Champion

- 2007 : 2nd, MBA Invitational Championship 2006

Men's Division 1 Runner-up

- 2006 : 14th, MBA Championship

Women's Division Runner-up

- 2006 : 26th, National Basketball Tournament

Men's Division 1 Champion

- 2006 : 26th, National Basketball Tournament

Men's Division 2 Champion

- 2006 : 26th, National Basketball Tournament

Women's Division Runner-up
