= 2023 Neelan Fihaara fire =

2023 fire in Malé, Maldives

Neelan Fihaara Fire
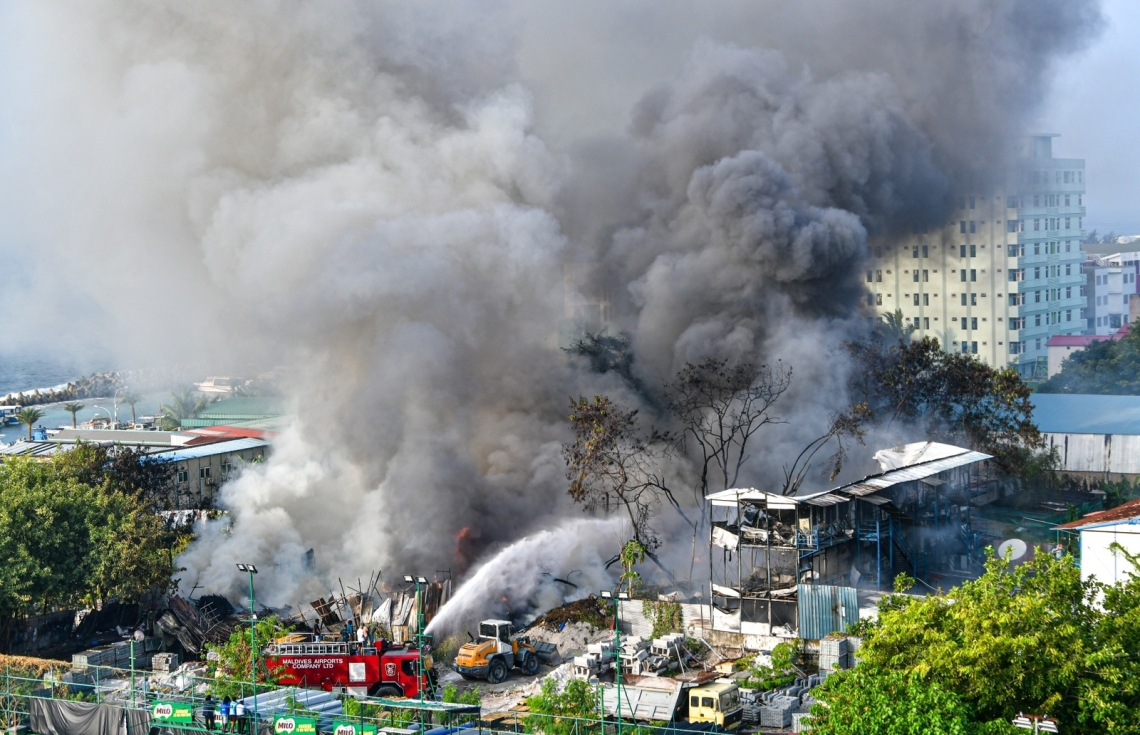
- Date: 9 January 2023
- Time: 00:45 UTC
- Duration: 4 hours
- Location: Falhumathee Magu, Galolhu, Malé, Maldives
- Type: Structure fire
- Outcome: Significant damage to the shop and accommodation block

On 9 January 2023, a major fire broke out at 05:45 local time (00:45 UTC) at the Neelan Fihaara, the largest secondhand market in Malé, Maldives. The fire caused significant destruction, particularly to an accommodation block housing 166 Malé City Council staff. Despite the extensive damage, no injuries were reported.

== Background ==
Neelan Fihaara market is a prominent secondhand market located in Malé City. It had faced fire incidents in the past, with significant events occurring in 2015 and 2017, both of which were suspected to be acts of arson. The market serves as an essential hub for secondhand goods and houses various accommodation facilities for city council staff.

== Impact and response ==
The fire completely destroyed the accommodation block, displacing the 166 city council staff members who resided there. Nearby schools, universities and businesses experienced disruptions due to smoke and safety concerns. Residents of Malé were advised to stay indoors and wear masks to protect themselves from the smoke. Emergency responders, including the Maldives National Defence Force (MNDF) and the Maldives Police Service, worked for over two hours to bring the fire under control.

Authorities launched an investigation into the cause of the fire, focusing on safety measures and the potential for arson, given the market's history of suspicious fires. The Maldives government and local organizations provided support to those affected, offering temporary housing and essential supplies for the displaced staff.

Malé Mayor Mohamed Muizzu highlighted that prior plans to relocate Neelan Fihaara had been blocked by state-level disapproval, which exacerbated the challenges faced during the recovery process. The fire also resulted in the loss of important documents, complicating aid efforts.
