= Dhonfanu =

Dhonfanu ދޮންފަނު
- Inhabited island
- Location in Maldives
- Coordinates: 05°11′20″N 73°07′25″E
- Country: Maldives
- Administrative atoll: Baa Atoll
- Distance to Malé: 119.96 km (74.54 mi)

Dimensions
  - Length: 0.700 km (0.435 mi)
  - Width: 0.500 km (0.311 mi)

Population (2022)
  - Total: 398
- Time zone: UTC+05:00 (MST)

Dhonfanu (Dhivehi: ދޮންފަނު) is one of the inhabited islands of Baa Atoll in the Maldives.

== Geography ==
The island is 119.96 km (75 mi; 65 nmi) north of the country's capital, Malé.

== Demography ==
Historical population
Year	Pop.	±%
2006	305	—
2014	359	+17.7%
2022	398	+10.9%
2006-2014-2022: Census populations Source:
