= Dhiyamingili =

Dhiyamigili ދިޔަމިގިލި
- Inhabited island
- Location in Maldives
- Coordinates: 02°20′15″N 73°20′00″E
- Country: Maldives
- Administrative atoll: Thaa Atoll
- Distance to Malé: 204.15 km (126.85 mi)

Dimensions
  - Length: 0.475 km (0.295 mi)
  - Width: 0.310 km (0.193 mi)

Population (2022)
  - Total: 649
- Time zone: UTC+05:00 (MST)

Dhiyamigili (Dhivehi: ދިޔަމިގިލި) is one of the inhabited islands of Thaa Atoll.

== Geography ==
The island is 204.15 km (127 mi; 110 nmi) south of the country's capital, Malé.

== Demography ==
Historical population
Year	Pop.	±%
2006	452	—
2014	511	+13.1%
2022	649	+27.0%
2006-2022: Census populations Source:

== Economy ==
Dhiyaminili's main economic projects are in carpentry, rope making, collecting shells, masonry and fishing.
