= Finey (Haa Dhaalu Atoll) =

Finey ފިނޭ
- Inhabited island
- Location in Maldives
- Coordinates: 06°44′49″N 73°03′08″E
- Country: Maldives
- Geographic atoll: Thiladhummathi Atoll
- Administrative atoll: Haa Dhaalu Atoll
- Distance to Malé: 288.85 km (179.48 mi)

Dimensions
  - Length: 1.620 km (1.007 mi)
  - Width: 0.900 km (0.559 mi)

Population (2022)
  - Total: 409
- Time zone: UTC+05:00 (MST)

Finey (Dhivehi: ފިނޭ) is one of the inhabited islands of Haa Dhaalu Atoll administrative division and geographically part of Thiladhummathi Atoll in the north of the Maldives.

== Geography ==
The island is 288.85 km (179 mi; 156 nmi) north of the country's capital, Malé.

This island is 1.6 km (0.99 mi) long and 0.9 km (0.56 mi) wide..

== Demographics ==
According to the most recently available data, the 2022 Maldives Census, Finey had a total population of 409 residents, made up of 227 females and 182 males. Of these, 380 were Maldivian-born nationals and 29 were foreigners, the latter representing about seven percent of the island’s total population.

Staying consistent with national employment trends where foreign workers account for a greater share of the Maldivian workforce. Foreigners in Finey are employed in local services, including but not limited to agriculture, education, and construction.

Population of Finey (2022)
| Category | Both Sexes | Female | Male |
| Total population | 409 | 227 | 182 |
|---|---|---|---|
| Maldivian | 380 | 221 | 159 |
| Foreign | 29 | 6 | 23 |

== Economy ==
Finey’s economy is primarily based on agriculture, making it one of the most agriculturally active islands in Haa Dhaalu Atoll. The island’s fertile soil supports locally sourced cultivation of fruits and vegetables alike, such as yams, bananas, coconuts, and a variety of vegetables.

Historically, Finey served as a local agricultural hub within the atoll, where residents from neighbouring islands visited to purchase fruits, vegetables, and coconuts produced on the island. A significantly large area of the island is still allocated to farming plots, supporting a community of both experienced and aspiring local farmers.

In recent years, the Finey Council has advanced sustainable agricultural practices and maintained designated lands for private and commercial cultivation. Finey’s relatively large land area and fertile environment continue to make it an important contributor to food production in the northern Maldives.

The island’s economy is also expected to benefit from planned harbour development projects, which aim to improve transport and trade availability across Haa Dhaalu Atoll. Finey’s natural landscape, including mangroves and agricultural lands, and sandy shores also holds potential for small-scale eco-tourism and community-based environmental projects.
