= Bileffahi =

Bileffahi ބިލެތްފަހި
- Inhabited island
- Location in Maldives
- Coordinates: 06°20′20″N 72°58′32″E
- Country: Maldives
- Geographic atoll: Miladhummadulhu Atoll
- Administrative atoll: Shaviyani Atoll
- Distance to Malé: 246.46 km (153.14 mi)

Dimensions
  - Length: 1.920 km (1.193 mi)
  - Width: 0.630 km (0.391 mi)

Population (2022)
  - Total: 502
- Time zone: UTC+05:00 (MST)

Bileffahi (Dhivehi: ބިލެތްފަހި) is one of the inhabited islands of the Shaviyani Atoll administrative division and geographically part of the Miladhummadulhu Atoll in the Maldives.

== Geography ==
The island is 246.46 km (153 mi; 133 nmi) north of the country's capital, Malé.

== Demography ==
Historical population
Year	Pop.	±%
2006	398	—
2014	465	+16.8%
2022	502	+8.0%
2006-2014: Census populations Source:
