= Naushad Waheed =

Maldivian cartoonist (born 1962)

- ނައުޝަދު ވަހީދު
- Born: Naushad Waheed Hassan Manik; 15 December 1962 (age 63); Machchangolhi, Malé, Maldives
- Spouse: Aishath Hussain (m. 1989)
- Children: 2
- Relatives: Mohamed Waheed Hassan (brother)

Deputy Ambassador of the Maldives to the United Kingdom
- In office 2008 – 16 February 2012
- President: Mohamed Nasheed; Mohamed Waheed Hassan

Naushad Waheed Hassan Manik (born 15 December 1962) is a cartoonist and painter from the Maldives.

== Early life and education ==
Manik was born on 15 December 1962 in Machchangolhi, Malé, Maldives. He studied in Majeediyya School. In 1976, he undertook his first art class, soon becoming more interested in arts. In 1978, he went to South India and was influenced by his art master. In 1980, he was awarded the best all round artist in his school.

In 1987, he met Suzanne Pruner, in California, US Pruner financed Manik to study at Art Instruction School in Minneapolis, Minnesota.

== Career ==
Manik participated in the 4th South Asian art biennale, held in Dhaka, Bangladesh, where he met several Asian artists. After Manik was imprisoned in 1990 for drawing a political cartoon, his fame grew as a political cartoonist. In 1993, Qasim Ibrahim commissioned Manik to draw 1200 canvases. In that same year, Manik drew a controversial portrait of President Maumoon Abdul Gayoom, which stunned locals.

He was appointed as Deputy High Commissioner of Maldives to the UK in 2008, later resigning in 2012 after the resignation of Mohamed Nasheed. He was later reappointed at an unknown date and later dismissed on 13 September 2023 after calling Mohamed Nasheed the 'founder of democracy in the Maldives.'

== Detainment ==
Manik was taken as a political prisoner in 1990 after drawing a political cartoon in a public weekly newspaper. He spent three years in house arrest, but was later pardoned by president Maumoon Abdul Gayoom.

He was detained by the government for four months following the publication of one of his cartoons in the magazine Hukuru in 1999. Manik's charge was retaliatory. In 2001, he was arrested for participating in debates critical of the government, tried for treason, and sentenced to 15 years in prison. He was released on 22 February 2006.

While Manik was imprisoned, he was named an Amnesty International prisoner of conscience.

== Family life ==
Manik is the brother of former president Mohamed Waheed Hassan. Manik has been married to Aishath Hussain since 1989, and has had two children.

== Award ==
Naushad received the President's award in 1997 for his drawings.
