= Mohamed bin Hajj Ali Thukkala =

- Sultan Mohamed ibn Haji Ali Tukala

Kingdom of Maldives
- Reign: 1692–1701
- Predecessor: Sultan Muhammad Shamsuddeen I
- Successor: Sultan Ali VII
Regnal name
- Kula Ran Mani
- House: House of Dhevvadhoo
- Father: Al-Amir Haji Ali Thukkala Maafai Kilege bin Muhammad al-Kabir Fadiyaru Thakurufaanu of Addu Atoll
- Mother: Aisha Dio, of Davaddu Island, Huvadu Atoll

Qazi Mohamed bin Hajj Ali Thukkala (Arabic: محمد بن الحاج علي ثقالة; Dhivehi: މުޙައްމަދު ބިން ހައްޖު އަލީ ތުއްކަލާ), was one of the Chief Justices of Maldives. Later he was Sultan Mohamed bin Hajj Ali Thukkala. He was also known as Dhevvadhoo Rasgefaanu.

The coral stone mosque in Fenfushi which is a UNESCO heritage site was built between 1692 and 1701 CE during Sultan Mohamed bin Hajj Ali Thukkala's reign. It is one of the few coral stone mosques which are with all of the components in the complex in good condition. This includes the mosque building, wells made of coral stone, a unique bathing tank of coral stone, a sun dial, tombstones of fine quality with within the large cemetery and boundary wall of coral masonry with two entrances surrounding the mosque.

The mosque has a symbol used by Sultan Mohamed bin Hajj Ali Thukkalaa suggesting that it might have been repaired or renovated by him.

He took great interest in learning, scholarship, forbade inhumane punishments, reduced taxation, assisted those who were in debt and restored the mosques.

His first marriage was to H.H. Sanfaa Kanba Khadija Kabafaanu Rani Kilege who was the elder daughter of Ibrahim Sahbandaru Kilege of Isdu. His second marriage in 1693 was to Maryam Kabafanu who was the widow of H.H. Sultan Sayyd Muhammadh Shamsuddin al-Hamawi and former wife of Sultan Muhammad Muhiudin Adil, and daughter of the Velana Thakurufaanu of Fenfuri. His third marriage was to Sanfaa Bifaanu who was the daughter of the Vizier Haji Hussain Handegiri Kilege Thakurufaanu.

Before Sultan he was a magistrate for fourteen years and he assigned Hassan Thajudeen as the new chief justice on the seventh day Wednesday 12 November 1692 of him becoming Sultan.

The sale of independent women and their employment as unpaid slaves was prohibited during his reign. Before this the aristocracy was free to make people work without pay and could sell them just like slaves. Slaves were encouraged to appeal to Hassan Thajudeen who instructed them released and made a symbolic payment to the owners.

People were made debt free after checking their accounts with outstanding paid by the treasury. Homeless orphans were given the right to inherit deceased people's properties. The use of swords and daggers to avenge adultery were prohibited and instructed to be carried through the judgements of the court.

For the first time in history slavery was forbidden during Sultan Ali Thukkala's reign.

A grant issued in the matter of building and upkeep of a mosque in the island of Geney in Thiladhummathi Atoll of Maldives, in late AD 1696 under the Seal of the King Siri Kula Ran Mani of Maldives referred to him as "Malekaddu Midhemedhu ekanuonna mi korhu anikaneh nethee korhu" which meant "Sole Sovereign with no other over what lies between Maliku and Addu".

The Sultan was likely poisoned and died in Male', on 16 January 1701 and was buried with his first wife in Friday Mosque of Male', Maldives.

== Genealogy ==
Sultan Mohamed bin Hajj Ali Thukkala was the son of Hajj Ali Thukkala son of Chief Justice Mohamed Shamsuddin
