= Goidhoo (Shaviyani Atoll) =

Goidhoo ގޮއިދޫ
- Inhabited island
- Location in Maldives
- Coordinates: 06°25′45″N 72°55′23″E
- Country: Maldives
- Geographic atoll: Miladhummadulhu Atoll
- Administrative atoll: Shaviyani Atoll
- Distance to Malé: 257.56 km (160.04 mi)

Dimensions
  - Length: 2.160 km (1.342 mi)
  - Width: 0.670 km (0.416 mi)

Population (2022)
  - Total: 592
- Time zone: UTC+05:00 (MST)

Goidhoo (Dhivehi: ގޮއިދޫ) is one of the inhabited islands of the Shaviyani Atoll administrative division and geographically part of the Miladhummadulhu Atoll in the Maldives.

== Geography ==
The island is 257.56 km (160 mi; 139 nmi) north of the country's capital, Malé.

== Demography ==
Historical population
Year	Pop.	±%
2006	416	—
2014	497	+19.5%
2022	592	+19.1%
2006-2022: Census populations Source:
