= National Library of Maldives =

Coordinates: 4.1778°N 73.5111°E

- Qaumee Kuthubukhaanaa
- Location: Medhuziyaaraiy Magu, Malé, Maldives
- Type: Public, National library.
- Established: 12 July 1945; 80 years ago

Other information
- Website: www.nlm.gov.mv

The National Library of the Republic of the Maldives (Qaumee Kuthubuhaanaa) was established in 1945. It serves as the Public and National Library of the country, maintaining modern literature. It provides a diverse collection of all published reading materials and documents within the country. The National Library is financed by the government and functions under the Ministry of Arts Culture and Heritage.

== History ==
The National Library of the Republic of Maldives was founded on 12 July 1945 as the "State Library" (Dhaulathuge Kuthubukhaanaa) of the Maldives by Ameer Mohamed Amin Didi, then the Head of the Department of Education. In 1948, The Library was renamed to Majeedhee Library (Majeedhee Kuthubukhaanaa) named after one of the most popular statesmen of the Maldives, Ameer Abdul Majeed Didi ('Abdul Majeed Rannabandeyri Kilegefaanu). The library was functioning under the Ministry of Home Affairs (Vuzaarathudhdhaakhiliyyaa). During this time, it received a revolving book collection from the Colombo based British Council, it was to be rotated every three months. The library also received a book collection left by the British in the Gan Island, Seenu Atoll. The library service duties were carried out by Sayyid 'Abdul Latheef. In 1978, the government created a librarian post and appointed Habeeba Hussayn Habeeb as the librarian. The Library was now under supervision of the President's Office. The government decided to bring a delegate from UNESCO in 1980. The role of the delegate was to consult the government's development plan of the library and school libraries in Maldives, thus resulted in the first librarianship courses conducted at the library. The library was renamed a second time on 1 June 1982 by the former President of the Maldives, Maumoon Abdul Gayoom as the National Library (Qaumee Kuthubuhaanaa). In 1993, the library began operating under the Ministry of Information and Broadcasting, later on changing between 2009-2013 to the Ministry of Tourism, which changed again after 2013 from working as a department under the Ministry of Youth and Sports. In 13 July 2018 onwards it's been operating under the Ministry of Arts Culture and Heritage.

The Library has a fairly good number of Arabic, Urdu, Dhivehi, and English books. The English section holds more than 37,970 books including both Reference Fiction and Non-Fiction. Dhivehi section, Arabic section and Urdu section holds 10212, 1570 and 950 books respectively. In addition, the Library holds special collections in its American Corner; UN collection; Women and Gender collection. Serial collection holds periodical volumes, reports, manuscripts, journals and other serials, newspapers and press cutting files, and pamphlets. The Library's collection includes books relating to different subjects such as: Generalities; Philosophy & Psychology; Religion; Social Sciences; Environment; Language; Natural Sciences & Mathematics; Technology (Applied Science); The Arts - Fine and Decorative arts; Literature & Rhetoric; Geography & History.

== External links and references ==
- Official Website of the National Library
- More information
