= Angolhitheemu =

- Inhabited island
- Location in Maldives
- Coordinates: 5°47′36.92″N 73°0′22.36″E
- Country: Maldives
- Administrative atoll: Raa Atoll
- Distance to Malé: 187.44 km (116.47 mi)

Dimensions
  - Length: 0.850 km (0.528 mi)
  - Width: 0.500 km (0.311 mi)

Population (2014)
  - Total: 403 (including foreigners)
- Time zone: UTC+05:00 (MST)

Angolhitheemu (Dhivehi: އަނގޮޅިތީމު) is one of the islands in Raa Atoll with population of 500 people.

== History ==
Angolhitheem is conceded as on one of the islands in which the early settlers of Maldives lived. History tells us that Koimala, a prince from presumably South India who sailed to the Maldives with his Sinhalese wife alongside ships of slaves and treasure. He initially made his first stop at Maalhosmadulu Uthuruburi [Raa Atoll], in the island Rasgatheemu, with his slaves settled in Angolhitheemu island. The names of the islands were also dubbed by the king as Rasgatheemu – King's Island and Angolhitheemu-Slaves Island respectively. However, Koimala wished to move down-south to the Central Maldives sailing and reaching a sandbank with Fisherman on the Central East of Maldives.

== Geography ==
The island is 187.44 km (116 mi; 101 nmi) north of the country's capital, Malé. This island is a medium-sized island, with a total area of 34 ha (84 acres).

== Demography ==
Historical population
Year	Pop.	±%
2006	272	—
2014	373	+37.1%
2006-2014: Census populations Source:

The total population of An'golhitheem is around 500 people including men, women and children and almost 200 people are living on the island. Rest of people living in capital city Malé, other few islands and commercial island including resorts.

== Economy ==
The people of An'golhitheem work at either resort jobs or government jobs, while most of the women work locally for their income.
