= Nolhivaranfaru =

Nolhivaranfaru ނޮޅިވަރަންފަރު
- Inhabited island
- Location in Maldives
- Coordinates: 6°41′50″N 73°07′15″E
- Country: Maldives
- Geographic atoll: Thiladhummathi Atoll
- Administrative atoll: Haa Dhaalu Atoll
- Distance to Malé: 284.67 km (176.89 mi)

Dimensions
  - Length: 3.800 km (2.361 mi)
  - Width: 0.900 km (0.559 mi)

Population (2022)
  - Total: 1,254
- Time zone: UTC+05:00 (MST)

Nolhivaranfaru (Dhivehi: ނޮޅިވަރަންފަރު) is one of the inhabited islands of Haa Dhaalu Atoll administrative division and geographically part of Thiladhummathi Atoll in the north of the Maldives.

== History ==
Following the 1752 capture of Male' by the Ali Raja of Cannanore and his Malabari navy, Sultan Muhammad Imaduddin III of the Maldives was held captive on Kavaratti island in the Laccadives. Hussein Gadhahamaadhi Manikfan of Nolhivaranfaru is said to have aided Muleegey Dom Hassan Maniku in the fight against the invaders. They succeeded on 7 April 1753 and reclaimed the monarchy back to Maldivian rule.

== Geography ==
The island is 284.67 km (177 mi; 154 nmi) north of the country's capital, Malé.

It is located in between the island of Nolhivaram and Hanimaadhoo on the eastern fringes of the atoll. It is small predominantly agricultural community. Until taken over by Kulhudhuffushi, Nolhivaranfaru used to be the capital of the Haa Dhaalu division.

== Demography ==
Historical population
Year	Pop.	±%
2006	260	—
2014	991	+281.2%
2022	1,254	+26.5%
2026	2,064	+64.6%
2006-2014: Census populations Source:

== Healthcare ==
The Island has a Small Island health Center with A Pharmacy nearby.It also has 2 Ambulances Donated from Japan.
