= Faridhoo =

- Uninhabited island
- Location in Maldives
- Coordinates: 06°47′09″N 73°03′16″E
- Country: Maldives
- Geographic atoll: Thiladhummathi Atoll
- Administrative atoll: Haa Dhaalu Atoll
- Distance to Malé: 292.11 km (181.51 mi)

Dimensions
  - Length: 0.620 km (0.385 mi)
  - Width: 0.480 km (0.298 mi)

Population
  - Total: 0
- Time zone: UTC+05:00 (MST)

Faridhoo (Dhivehi: ފަރިދޫ) is one of the Uninhabited islands of Haa Dhaalu Atoll administrative division and geographically part of Thiladhummathi Atoll in the north of the Maldives.

Faridhoo has the highest natural point in the Maldives at 3m above sea level. This makes the Maldives the country with the lowest highest point. It is believed that Buddhist ruins from the pre-Islamic era are buried at this site.
