= Nolhivaram =

Nolhivaran ނޮޅިވަރަމު
- Inhabited island
- Location in Maldives
- Coordinates: 06°39′48″N 73°04′51″E
- Country: Maldives
- Geographic atoll: Thiladhummathi Atoll
- Administrative atoll: Haa Dhaalu Atoll
- Distance to Malé: 279.2 km (173.5 mi)

Dimensions
  - Length: 2.170 km (1.348 mi)
  - Width: 1.150 km (0.715 mi)

Population (2022)
  - Total: 1,985
- Time zone: UTC+05:00 (MST)

Nolhivaram (Dhivehi: ނޮޅިވަރަމު), Nolhivaran or Nolhivaramu is one of the inhabited islands of Haa Dhaalu Atoll administrative division and geographically part of Thiladhummathi Atoll in the north of the Maldives.

== History ==
It is believed to be one of the oldest inhabited islands in the Maldives and ethnographically very different from the rest of the islands. This is evident from the name ending in varam or varan. A separate indigenous group different from the first Maldivian settlers is said to have come from South India and named their islands Varam (also the islands formerly called Kuruhinnavaram and Giraavaram contained their settlements). Nolhivaram was among the islands severely damaged during the great cyclone of 1821 that hit the northern atolls of the Maldives. This was during the reign of Sultan Muhammad Mueenuddeen I.

== Geography ==
The island is 279.2 km (173 mi; 151 nmi) north of the country's capital, Malé.

== Demography ==
Historical population
Year	Pop.	±%
2006	1,554	—
2014	1,830	+17.8%
2022	1,985	+8.5%
2006-2014-2022: Census populations Source:
