= Maldives Islamic Bank =

Maldivian Bank

- Type: Public
- Industry: Banking
- Headquarters: H. Medhuziyaaraidhoshuge, Medhuziyaaraiy Magu, Malé, Maldives
- Key people: Kazi Abu Muhammad Majedur Rahman (Chairman); Mufaddal Idris Khumri (CEO and Managing Director)
- Services: Islamic Banking
- Total assets: 1 Billion USD (2026)
- Website: https://www.mib.com.mv/

Maldives Islamic Bank is a Maldivian bank and Shariah-compliant financial services company headquartered in Malé, Maldives. The bank was established on August 2, 2010 and obtained approval to commence operations on March 6, 2010.

== History ==
The bank was founded in 2010, as a joint venture between the Government of Maldives and Islamic Corporation Development (ICD), the private sector development arm of Islamic Development Bank (IDB). The opening ceremony for the bank was held on March 7th, with former president Mohamed Nasheed and the then chairman of the bank and CEO of IDB, Khaled Al-Aboodi. This marked the establishment of Islamic banking services in the Maldives.

== Recognition ==
MMA Financial Inclusion Award, 2026
