= Maakandoodhoo =

- uninhabited island
- Location in Maldives
- Coordinates: 6°14′05″N 73°16′02″E
- Country: Maldives
- Geographic atoll: Miladhummadulhu Atoll
- Administrative atoll: Shaviyani Atoll
- Distance to Malé: 228.10 km (141.73 mi)

Government
  - Island Chief: none

Dimensions
  - Length: 1.160 km (0.721 mi)
  - Width: 0.950 km (0.590 mi)

Population (951 in 2004)
  - Total: 0
- Time zone: UTC+05:00 (MST)

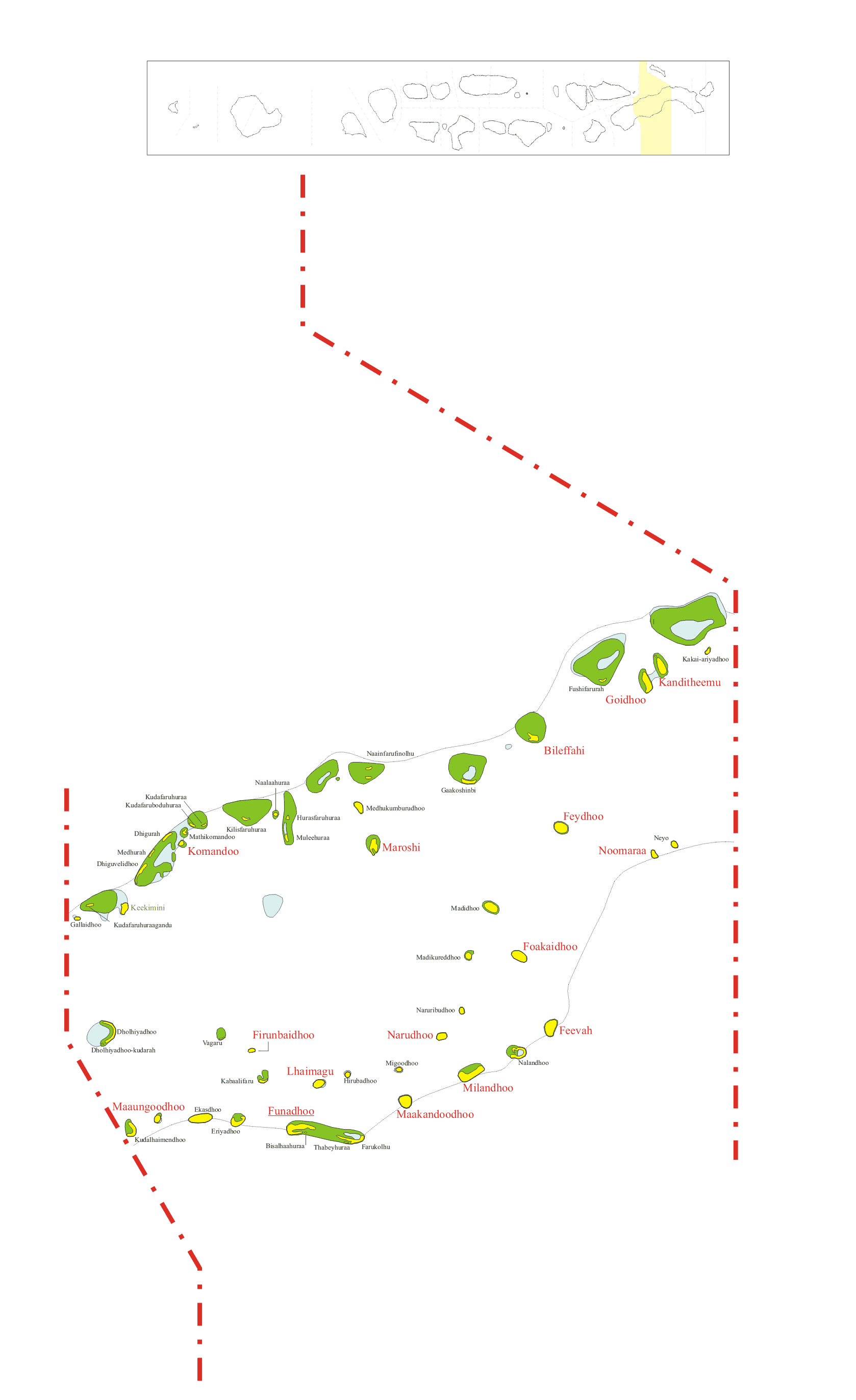
Map of Shaviyani Atoll including Maakandoodhoo Island (centre bottom)

Maakandoodhoo (Dhivehi: މާކަނޑޫދޫ) is one of the uninhabited islands of the Shaviyani Atoll administrative division and geographically part of the Miladhummadulhu Atoll in the Maldives.

Maakandoodhoo has loose soil and muddy land, which makes it difficult to build houses. The well water is dirty and stinks as well from the condition of the land. The strong current and waves surrounding the island make travel on and off the island difficult. Residents decided they needed a better island to live on. They chose a nearby island called Milandhoo, and in 2000, the government started relocating the population to Milandhoo. The process took several years, as they had to wait for housing and infrastructure to be built, and by 2006, the relocation had been completed.
