= Bank of Maldives =

Maldives financial institution

- Type: Public company
- Industry: Financial services
- Founded: 1982; 44 years ago Malé, Maldives
- Headquarters: Malé, Republic of Maldives
- Key people: Mohamed Shareef (CEO)
- Products: Banking services
- Revenue: ▲MVR 4.8 billion (2024)
- Operating income: ▲MVR 3.7 billion (2024)
- Net income: ▲MVR 2.25 billion (2024)
- Total assets: ▲MVR 48.44 billion (2024)
- Number of employees: 1,000+ (2024)
- Website: bankofmaldives.com.mv

Bank of Maldives (BML) is a Maldivian bank and financial services company based in Malé, Maldives. Established in 1982, it is the largest bank in the country by assets and branch presence. As of 2025, the bank serves over 365,000 customers and offers personal, business, and corporate banking services through 39 branches, 100 self-service banking centers, 165 ATMs, and digital platforms.

== History ==
=== Founding ===
The establishment of a domestic commercial bank in the Maldives was first proposed in 1979. Over the following three years, the Government of Maldives held negotiations with Bangladesh's International Finance and Investment Company Limited (IFIC Bank) to establish a joint venture bank. The talks were led by then Director of Finance, Ismail Fathy.

Bank of Maldives was officially inaugurated on 11 November 1982 by President Maumoon Abdul Gayoom. At its founding, 60% of the shares were held by the Maldivian government and 40% by IFIC Bank.

=== Geographic expansion ===
The bank opened its first branch outside Malé in December 1983, in Gan, Addu Atoll. This marked a strategic move to serve the southernmost population center in the country. A second branch was established in Naifaru, Lhaviyani Atoll, in 1990, expanding the bank's presence in the northern atolls.

Over the next two decades, Bank of Maldives steadily expanded its network across the country. By 2016, it had established at least one branch in each of the Maldives’ 20 atolls.

As of 2025, the bank operates 39 branches, 100 self-service banking centres, 165 ATMs, and maintains a network of over 200 agents across the Maldives.

=== Digital services ===
Bank of Maldives introduced the country's first Automated Teller Machines (ATMs) in January 2000, along with the BML Cash Card, the first locally issued debit card. The bank also launched the Maldives’ first Point-of-Sale (POS) terminal network during this period.

Internet Banking services for businesses were introduced in 2007, followed by personal Internet Banking in 2015 alongside the country's first Mobile Banking App, enabling customers to access banking services via smartphones.

In 2016, Bank of Maldives launched BML MobilePay, a QR-based payment app, as part of its efforts to enhance cashless transactions. The bank has since expanded its digital ecosystem with features such as online account opening, instant card issuance, wallet-to-wallet transfers, NFC-enabled “tap to pay,” and 24/7 online banking support.

== Products and services ==
=== Card Services ===
In 2004, American Express Cards became the first credit card to be launched by BML, followed by the American Express Debit card. Today, along with being the exclusive provider of American Express cards in the Maldives, the bank offers cards by international card partners, Visa and Mastercard.

=== Internet banking ===
Followed by the initial introductory phase for businesses in 2007, internet banking was officially rolled out to all personal customers of Bank of Maldives in 2015.

=== Mobile banking ===
The BML Mobile banking app was the first banking app launched by a local bank in the Maldives. BML MobilePay, the Bank's payment app, was launched in 2017 and in the year 2022, the bank merged its banking app and payment app into one. Contactless payment services and wallet-to-wallet transfer services are now available through the banking app.

=== Self-service banking ===
In 2000, four ATMs were newly installed, marking the beginning of self-service banking in the country. The Bank now has the largest network with 42 branches and service centers across all 20 atolls, 156 Self Service Banking Centers, 215 ATMs, over 200 agents and a full suite of Digital banking services. In December 2014, the first USD ATMs were introduced to Maldives.

=== Business banking ===
BML offers a range of banking services tailored for their business customers, which includes internet banking, payroll service, international trade and merchant services. The bank also has a dedicated business centre. For large corporates, BML provides corporate banking services.

== Corporate social responsibility ==
The Bank's support to communities continue through the Community Fund, financial literacy sessions across the nation, support for Persons with Disabilities and partnerships with charitable organisations.

To mark its 40th anniversary, BML carried out 12 monthly initiatives to support the community. The first initiative was the BML Scholarship Fund, an annual fund aimed at developing Maldivians in the field of banking and finance. Other initiatives include Startup Grant, Housing Grant, Small Grant, Fehi Project, Sports Scholarship, fund-raising platform Kindly, hackathon and innovation lab, support to Maldives National Museum, National Library, Oncology ward in IGMH and Home for People with Special Needs.

== Recognition ==
BML received "Asia’s Employer Brand" from the World HRD Congress and the Employer Branding Institute for four consecutive years.

The bank also received "Global Business Excellence Award for Outstanding Community Initiative" for its Dhoni Banking in 2013.

In 2016, the Bank received "Most Innovative Banking Team in the Indian Ocean" in the annual awards given by Capital Finance International London.

== Controversy ==
On 25 August 2024, BML suspended foreign transactions on its debit cards, a move that caused widespread panic for Maldivians living abroad. In the same day, BML reversed the suspension and returned to its previous policies. This suspension was labelled as a 'financial coup' by president of the Maldives Mohamed Muizzu along with Economic Minister Mohamed Saeed. Muizzu and Saeed also alleged that the Maldivian Democratic Party was in connection with the coup although no evidence has been shown. Nobody has been arrested in connection with the coup.
