= Isdhoo dynasty =

The Isdhoo dynasty was a Maldivian dynasty that lasted for three years, from 1701 to 1704 AD. During this period there were three rulers. It was followed by the Dhiyamigili dynasty.

== Rulers ==
Name	Regnal name	Duration of reign	Monarch from	Monarch until	Notes
Sultan Ali VII	Kula Ran Muiy	less than 1 year	1701	1701	Ali Shah Bandar or Isdu 'Ali Velana Thakuru'fa'anu, first Sultan of the Isdhoo dynasty Son of Ibrahim Shah Bandar Kilege of Isdhoo and Aysha Dio
Sultan Hasan X	Keerithi Maha Radun (no coronation)	less than 1 year	1701	1701 Abdicated	Son of Sultan Ali V Abdicated for cousin Ibrahim Mudzhiruddine He is also known as Addu Hassan Manikfan
Sultan Ibrahim Muzhir al-Din	Muthey Ran Mani Loka	3 years	1701	1704 Deposed	Cousin of Sultan Hasan X Deposed by his Prime Minister Muhammad Imaduddin during the regency of his spouse Fatima Kabafa'anu while on the Hajj pilgrimage.

== See also ==
- List of Maldivian monarchs
- List of Sunni dynasties
