= Fathimath Shafeega =

Fathimath Shafeega (Dhivehi: ފާތިމަތް ޝަފީގާ) (b. 21 September 1963), commonly known as Shafeega, is the former chief executive officer of the Capital Market Development Authority in the Maldives.

== Education ==
Shafeega received her secondary school education in Aminiya School, Malé, Maldives and later received her master's degree from Monash University, Melbourne, Australia.
