= Utheemu dynasty =

Maldivian royal dynasty (1632–1692)

The Utheemu dynasty was created in 1573 when Muhammad Thakurufaanu Al Auzam became sultan of the Maldives. The dynasty was named after the northern Maldives island of Utheemu, birthplace of Muhammad Thakurufaan. Muhammad Thakurufaan is considered a national hero, as he and his two brothers led a successful rebellion against the Portuguese and established his country's independence. Thirteen more sultans ruled during this dynastic period, which ended in 1697.

From 1602 to 1607, a French sailor, François Pyrard de Laval, spent time in the Maldives and gave a detailed account of the customs of the islanders during the Utheemu dynasty. His three-volume work was published in 1619 and is considered a valuable historical archive.

== See also ==
- List of Maldivian monarchs
- List of Sunni dynasties
