= The Scout Association of Maldives =

Scouting organisation in the Maldives

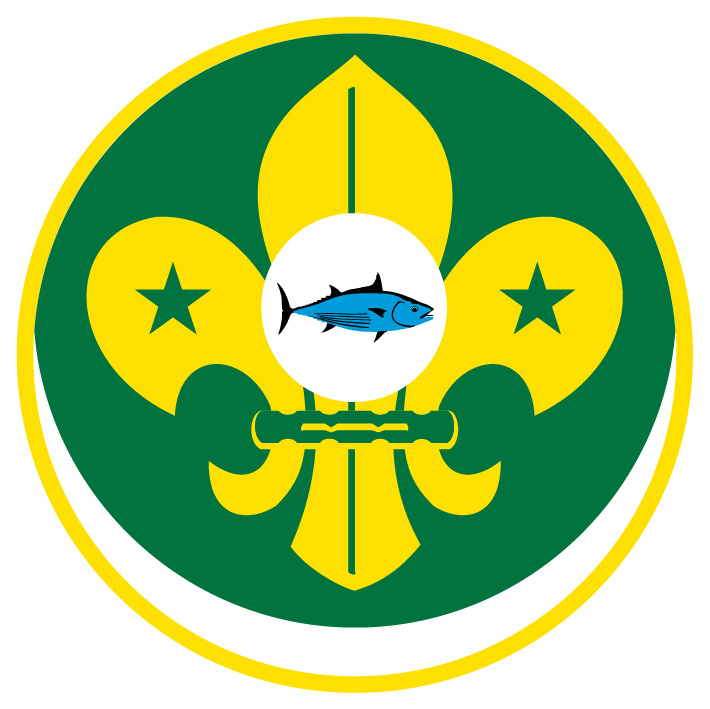
- Dhivehi: ދަ ސްކައުޓް އެސޯސިއޭޝަން އޮފް މޯލްޑިވްސް
- Headquarters: Chaandhanee Magu
- Location: Malé
- Country: Maldives
- Founded: 1963
- Membership: 5,538
- Chief Scout: Mohamed Muizzu
- President of the Association: Mohamed Nazeef
- Vice President: Fathmath Shehezinee
- Chief Commissioner: Maeed Mohamed Zahir
- Affiliation: World Organization of the Scout Movement
- Website scout.mv

Scouting was introduced to the Maldives in 1956, according to the National Centre for Linguistic and Historical Research. Initially, this Scouting was not carried out as a structured organization and very little is known about the history of Scouting of that period. Along with the introduction of English medium education in Malé, various co-curricular activities also had its beginning.

In May 1961, the First Malé Scout Group was formed in Majeediyya School. The Group began with Cub Scouting and later in the same year the junior Scout section began. In 1963, the Scout Group was registered at The Boy Scouts Association Imperial Headquarters by its Commonwealth commissioner, Charles Dymoke Green Jr. In this period, the chief commissioner of Maldives was the late Mr. Ahmed Zaki.

On 26 August 1983, Malé English School started scouting as the 2nd Malé Scout Group and Ahmadhiyya International School started on 3 September as the 3rd Malé Scout Group.

On 1986, the first National Scout Jamboree was held from 20 to 23 September 1986 at Kuda Bandos with 300 Scouts, 250 Cub Scouts, 300 Girl Guides, and Brownies. The first inter-school Scout Competition was held in Malé on 23 June 1988.

Maldivian Scouting was first received recognition from the Maldivian Government on 20 January 1984, the association was registered as the "Maldives Boy Scout Association" under the Ministry of Home Affairs as an NGO. It became a member of the World Organization of the Scout Movement (WOSM) on 23 July 1990. It changed its name to "The Scout Association of Maldives" on 14 January 1994.

== Leadership ==
The President of the Maldives, Mohamed Muizzu, is the current Chief Scout of Maldives. The association's National Scout Council has twelve members, including its president elected by the National Scout Assembly to govern the association on behalf of the assembly. No more information on the membership and election of the National Scout Assembly is available. An executive committee, led by the Chief Commissioner is appointed by the council to manage day-to-day affairs of the association.

== Programs ==
- Pre-Cub (aged 5-8)
- Cub Scout (aged 8-12)
- Scout (aged 12-18)
- Rover Scout (aged 18-26)
