= Maldives Girl Guide Association =

Girl Guide organisation in Maldives

- Official logo
- Headquarters: H. Crescent Moon, Vaijeheymagu
- Location: Malé
- Country: Maldives
- Founded: 1962
- Membership: 7,307
- President: Aishath Ali
- Chief Commissioner: Niumaath Shafeeg
- Chief Guide: Sajidha Mohamed
- Affiliation: World Association of Girl Guides and Girl Scouts
- Website girlguides.org.mv

The Maldives Girl Guide Association (MGGA) (Dhivehi: މޯލްޑިވްސް ގާލް ގައިޑް އެސޯސިއޭޝަން) is the national Guiding organisation of the Maldives. It serves 7,307 members (as of 2008). Founded in 1962, the girls-only organisation became an associate member of the World Association of Girl Guides and Girl Scouts in 1996 and a full member in 1999.

The Girl Guide emblem features a dhoani (boat).

== Ideals ==
=== Guide Law ===
Guide Law states:

1. A Guide's honour is to be trusted.
2. A Guide is loyal.
3. A Guide's duty is to be useful and to help others.
4. A Guide is a friend to all and a sister to every other Guide.
5. A Guide is courteous.
6. A Guide is a friend to animals and respects all living things.
7. A Guide obeys orders.
8. A Guide sings and smiles under all difficulties.
9. A Guide is thrifty.
10. A Guide is pure in thought, word and deed.

=== Guide Promise ===
The Guide Promise is:

I promise on my honour to do my best
To do my duty, to Allah and Country
To help other people at all times, and
to obey the Guide Law.

=== Guide motto ===
Be prepared

== Program ==
The association is divided in six sections according to age:

- Stars – ages 5 to 7
- Little Maids – ages 7 to 12
- Guides – ages 12 to 17
- Service Guides – ages 17 to 21
- Young Leaders - ages 17 to 35
- Adult Leaders – ages 18 and onwards

== See also ==
- The Scout Association of Maldives
