= Machchangolhi =

Coordinates: 4.174°N 73.508°E

Machchangolhi މައްޗަންގޮޅީ
- District of Malé
- Interactive map of Machchangolhi
- Country: Maldives

Government
  - Council: Malé City Council

Population (2022)
  - Total: 27,706
- Time zone: UTC+05:00 (MVT)

Machchangolhi (Dhivehi: މައްޗަންގޮޅީ), also known as Machangolhi, is a district of Malé, Maldives.

== Location within Malé City ==
Machchangolhi is in the southern and central portions of Malé Island:
