= Caste system in the Maldives =

The caste system in the Maldives is the social stratification system found among the ethnic groups of the islands.

The history of the stratification of the Maldivian social structure is not fully documented. However, the French explorer François Pyrard de Laval, who spent five years in the Maldives following a shipwreck in 1602, wrote an account of the islands in the early 17th century and made reference of the existence of caste-like groupings (status-groups) in Maldivian culture. A basic summary of the early castes or caste-like groupings is seen from the writings of Carl Wilhelm Rosset (1887), the materials of J. Gardiner's trip, and a number of works by H.C.P. Bell. In his book The Reha, Ibn Batuta says that both the high and low castes of the Maldives all go barefoot as evidence of caste existence. Among the South Asian countries, caste system is mentioned to be in existence in Pakistan, Bangladesh, Nepal, Sri Lanka, the Maldives and Bhutan.

In the past, the Maldives had a caste system, with the raveri, or palm-sap tappers, belonging to the lowest caste. However, caste differences were never as common in the Maldives as they were in the other nations. The distinction between the nobility (beyfulhunwa) and the common people in society was given more emphasis in the Maldives than it was in the Vedic caste system. There are no longer any customary differences, and there are also no marital restrictions in the Maldive sociocultural pattern.

Maldivian society serves as an example of a social structure that has lately shed a lot of stratification related characteristics while still perhaps holding onto certain remnants of the former caste society. Intriguingly, the social groupings that make up the highest social class in modern society — the aristocracy, as well as low caste groups like the Raaveri—are where the most pronounced vestiges are found.

Perhaps the most impressive proof of the social hierarchy's importance can be found in the Maldivian language. It maintains a quite complex system of honorific degrees that unifies common speech with this intricate social stratification. Various forms have a variety of versions, which are chosen based on the social position of the dialogue's participants.

== Account of caste system in 1885 ==
In 1885, during his visit to Malé, C.W. Rosset observed that the beds in the region were made of different materials based on caste. The higher castes used brass chains, the middle castes used iron chains, while the lower castes used coiled ropes to suspend the beds.

The beddings of different castes in Malé vary in materials and quality. The higher castes used red silk for their mattresses and pillows, the middle castes use cotton sheets, while the lower castes sleep on straw. Additionally, the mat used to cover the straw mattress was designed with patterns and quality that are determined by the caste of the owner.

C.W. Rosset mentions that several times when he visited the lower caste homes, the women of the home would participate in the conversation while always remaining invisible in their home.

C.W. Rosset mentions in his journal during his visit in 1885 that the lower caste formed 60 percent of the Maldives population.

Caste divisions were strictly upheld in Malé even during 1885.

== Abolishment of caste system in 1968 ==
This caste system was eliminated after the founding of the republic in 1968; as of now, just a few of its remnants remain.

== Segregation of caste ==
Occupational segregation in Maldives where the island of a given craft was isolated to others, is distinctive proof of the persistence of caste.

The craftsmen like the weavers, goldsmiths, locksmiths, blacksmiths, mat-weavers, potters, turners, and the carpenters and others, are all situated in different islands. In other words, their craftsmen do not mix; each craft has its own island. And people have also adhered to this rule.

Men of the jeweler caste and trade live in the islands of Rinbudhoo, Hulhudheli and Nilande Atoll. Raaverins (toddy-drawers) live in Thakandhoo, Uligan, Berimadu, and Tiffardu, three of the Thiladhunmathi province's islands.

== Surname and name structure ==
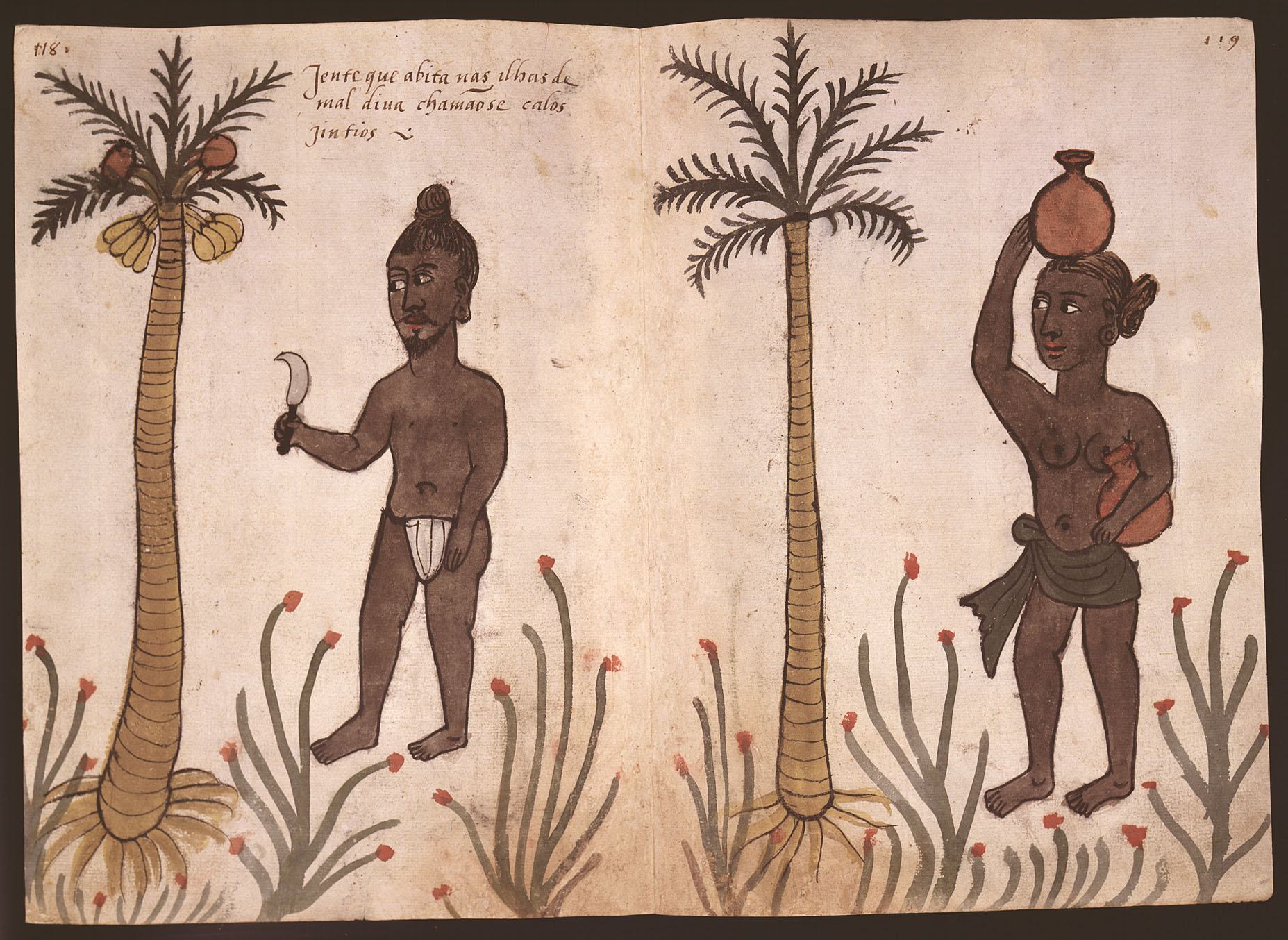
16th-century Portuguese illustration from the Códice Casanatense, depicting the Kalo caste.

Three parts make up the traditional Maldivian name, as examples Maakana Kudatuttu Didi or Dhoondeyri Ali Manikfan.

The surname was the first element, and the given name—or a word of affection like Tuttu, Kuda, or Don—or a combination of a term and a given name, as Kuda Hussain or Don Mariyambu—was the second element.

The third component, which was optional, signified status and/or cognomen via affiliation or birth.

Traditional birth ranks and cognomen included Manippulu, Goma, Kalaa, Kambaa, Rahaa, Manikfan, Didi, Seedi, Sitti, Maniku, Manike, Thakurufan, Thakuru, Kalo, Soru, Manje, and others.

The family surname was primarily patrilinearly transmitted. However, matrilinear transfer of surnames was not unusual. Which parent had a better social and economical situation determined this. The historically materialistic Maldivians would have given the children their mother's last name if the mother had more material possessions and better connections than the father.

=== Name inheritance ===
In the service of kings and nobles, slaves were frequently promoted to important positions. Sometimes, the given names of their slave ancestors were adopted as surnames by their descendants. For instance, a family by the name of Yaagoot descended from a slave by the same name who worked as a slave for a Diyamigili sultan in the eighteenth century. An African Negro slave by the name of Heyna who belonged to Sultan Mohamed Imaduddine IV in the nineteenth century was the ancestor of a family by that name.

== Offices and titles ==
Offices were more practical than titles and were not given to holders for life. The furadaana held the highest positions.

=== Furadaana ===
The majority of the kilege titles and furadaana positions shared names, with the only distinction being the removal of the kilege suffix (faan).

Faarhanaa, Rannabandeyri, Dorhimeyna, Faamuladeyri, Maafaiy, and Handeygiri or Handeygirin were among the Furadaana offices. One of the furadaana was usually the prime minister (Bodu Vizier).

However, there have been several instances of prime ministers who were either kileges or had no other positions.

The Faarhanaa, the Rannabandeyri, or the Handeygirin would have been the most likely candidates for prime minister among the furadaana.

Usually, the Dorhimeyna served as the military's commander-in-chief.

=== Vazirs ===
The vazierun, or ministers, were ranked below the furadaana in the sultans' and sultanas' courts. The line separating the ministers from the furadaana sometimes blurred in subsequent years.

The terms furadaana and ministers were frequently used interchangeably, with bodu muskulin replacing the term furadaana in ordinary speech.

The chief admiral and foreign minister was the Velaanaa (or Velaanaa-Shahbandar), the minister of public works was the Hakuraa, the chief treasurer was the Bodubandeyri, the chief of palace staff was the Maabandeyri, who was in charge of maintaining the royal seal known as the Kattiri Mudi, and the commander of the land forces was the Daharaa (or Daharada).

=== Division heads ===
Below the ministers, there were a number of smaller positions, such as the Meerubahuru, who oversaw immigration and the port of Malé.

There was also the Faiylia, who was in charge of keeping records of public business.

=== Chief justice ===
The Uttama Fandiyaaru, or chief justice, had authority over the furadaana. The chief justice was in charge of ecclesiastical and civil justice, as well as the maintenance of mosques, cemeteries, charity trusts, religious rites, and the approval of marriage and divorce.

He was also in charge of keeping the Tarikh, the official history book. The Bandaara Naibu, or the Attorney General, and the Chief Justice, shared responsibilities for criminal justice.

=== Governors ===
The atoluverin, or regional governors, acted as the sultan or sultana in the distant provinces ("atolls"). In the Maldive language, from which the word atoll (atolu) has been borrowed, atoll (atolu) refers to a province rather than a coral reef enclosing a lagoon.

Atoll's English counterpart in the Maldives is eterevari.

The kateeb, who was (and is now) the principal temporal and spiritual authority, served as the sultan or sultana's representative on each particular populated island or settlement. For the benefit of the bodubandeyri or chief treasurer, the atoluverin and the kateebs administered criminal justice and gathered the vaaru (poll tax) and varuvaa (land tax).

In Malé, the avarhuverin of Henveyru, Maafannu, Macchangoli, and Galollu had the temporal responsibilities of the regional kateebs as well as the atoluverin's tasks. In Malé, the avarhuverin were in charge of maintaining public lands, maintaining law and order, and administering criminal justice. Malé's kateebs were solely religious officials.

=== Gazi ===
Every island had a naibu (now known as Qadi or Gazi), who served as the chief justice's representative. The naibu was in charge of administering criminal justice as well as civil and religious justice.

He also approved marriage and divorce as well as the management of charity trusts known as waqf. Each island had a mudimu who served as the chief justice's representative and was in charge of maintaining mosques and graveyards.

=== Kilege ===
The kilege was the highest honor bestowed by the Maldives' sultans and sultanas. The following titles have been bestowed throughout the previous four to five centuries of the monarchy: Ras Kilege, to both men and women.

All of the following kileges are solely available to men: Faarhanaa Kilege, Rannabandeyri Kilege, Dorhimeyna Kilege, Faamuladeyri Kilege, Maafaiy Kilege, Kaulannaa Kilege, Oliginaa Kilege, Daharada Kilege, Kuda Rannabandeyri Kilege, and Kuda Dorhimeyna Kilege.

Only Rani Kilege, Maavaa Kilege, Kambaadi Kilege, and Maanayaa Kilege were given to women.

Over the past several hundred years, the term kilege has acquired the optional and honorific suffix "faan".

The king-sultan or the queen-sultana were the ex-officio Ras Kilege. The other kileges, who were also referred to as amirs or commanders of the realm, should not be confused with kaleygefan (or kaleyfan), which is either a term of low status or an honorary method of addressing or referring to holy individuals.

A person and his or her immediate family are promoted to the aristocracy when they are given the title of kilege, which were no inherited titles, though.

=== Kangathi ===
The term "kangathi" was a lesser title. These were frequently given to well-known regional figures or occasionally to Malé's middle class.

In contrast to the kilege nobles, the awardees were not recognized as aristocrats.

Maafahaiy, Meyna, Ranahamaanthi, Gadahamaanthi, Hirihamaanthi, Fenna, Wathabandeyri, Kaannaa, Daannaa, and Fandiaiy were some of the kangathi titles.

No instance of a woman receiving a kangathi title has been documented.

== Ranks ==
The names of the kangathi title-holders and officials, from the uttama fandiyaaru down to the kateeb and mudimu, were prefixed to their given names. In normal use, this would have been prefixed with a cognomen designating status by birth; this practice was presumably carried over from the pre-Islamic civilizations' caste systems.

These cognomen might have included everything from: The names of their offices would have been prefixed with Manikfan for Seedis, children and grandchildren of kileges, members of previous royal dynasties, and Thakurufan or Takkhan for middle-class individuals, and Kaleyfan or Kaleyge for lower-class individuals.

For instance, if a chief judge named Ibrahim had been born into the upper class, he would have gone by the names Ibrahim Uttama Fandiyaaru Manikfan and Ibrahim Uttama Fandiyaaru Kaleygefan. Regardless of his place of origin, he would have been addressed as Ibrahim Uttama Fandiyaaru, or the Subject Chief Justice Ibrahim, in all royal warrants, writs, and ceremonies.

The kileges were the exceptions to this rule; their names were solely prefixed with their kilege titles, regardless of status at birth. The recipient and his or her family were raised to the ranks of the aristocracy by the kilege title, which transcended any status attained by birth.

=== Royals ===
Members of the royal family had their names prefixed with Manippulu if they were princes, and Goma if they were princesses, or more frequently with nickname like Tuttu, Don, Titti, or Dorhy. The term "manippulu" was a new term.

Princes and princesses were both referred to as goma until the early eighteenth century. A prince was really called Kalaa, while a princess was called Kambaa.

The royal (patrilinear) line of the governing family did not hold any public office until in recent times of monarchy.

== Slaves ==
Slaves made up a large portion of the Maldivian population by the 14th century, when one of the oldest accounts of the islands, recorded by the renowned Arab traveler Ibn Batuta, first emerged. Most of them were transported in Arab boats to the Maldives. Slave Africans settled peacefully in the northern and central provinces in general. Mixed marriages were not unheard of, and slaves frequently intermarried with the locals. The slaves were eventually absorbed by several social groupings or castes, but mostly by the lower castes like the raaveri, who worked primarily in the coconut plantations.

The anthropometric characteristics of the descendants of African slaves may still be seen among the native people, especially in the capital city Malé and in the northern provinces of Maldives.

Despite having certain anthropometric traits that indicated they were descended from Africans, slaves gradually assimilated into the community, mostly with the lowest castes. In sub-continental India as well, the phenomenon of (former) slaves blending with lower castes is not unheard of.

=== Baburu slaves ===
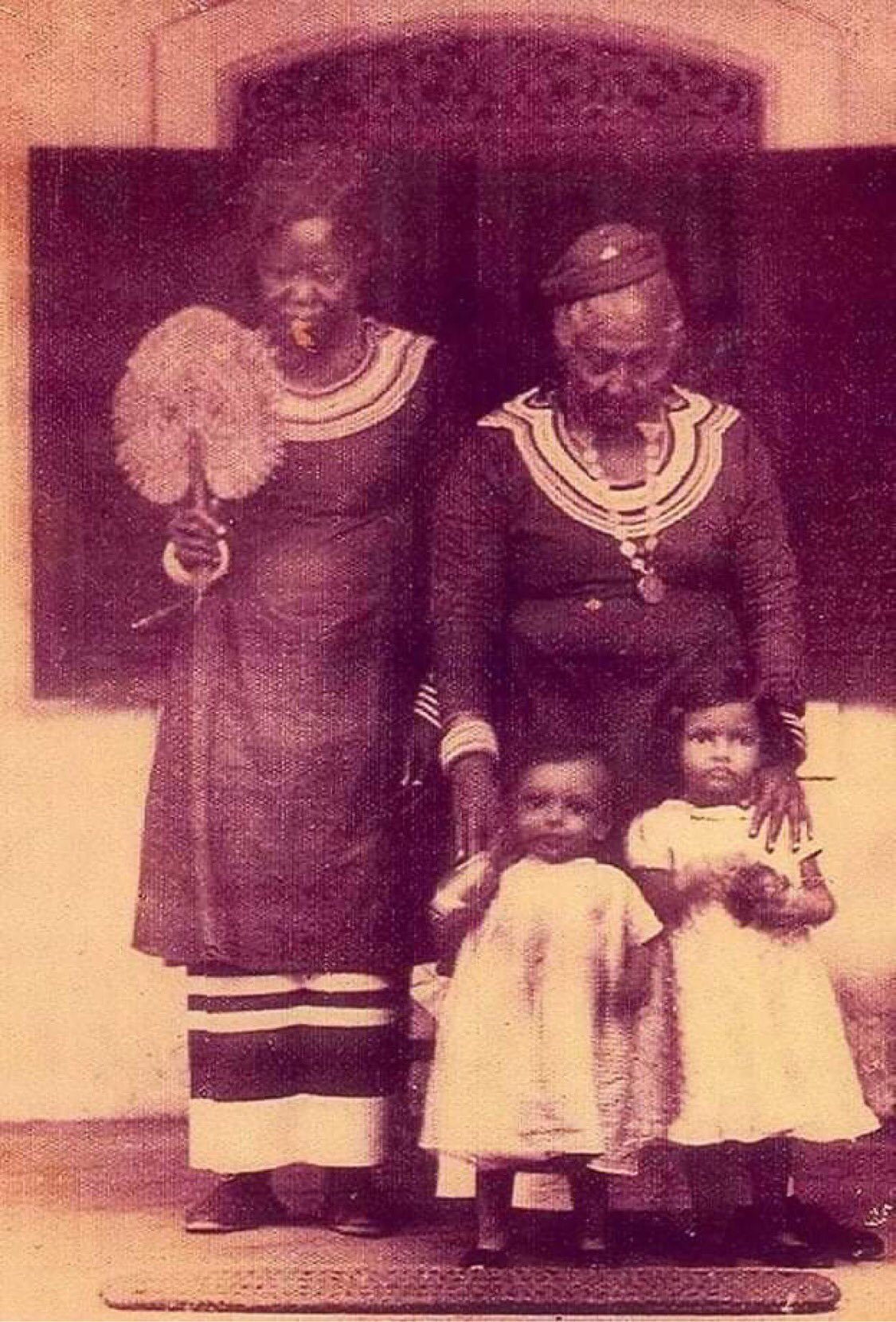
Baburu Aminaa Fulhu on the left who was the last first-generation slave of Maldives.

Slaves of African origin were called baburu, which meant negro in Maldives.

Slavery was well known in the Maldives, first and foremost in the nation's capital Male and on the islands where sizable populations of the nobility resided.

Arab vessels carried the majority of the slaves to the Maldives via the Indian Ocean slave trade. The majority of these routes for the slave trade began in East Africa and continued via the Zanzibar slave trade and the Omani port of Muscat. According to reports, Sultan Hasan Ill authorized the purchase of a large number of slaves in the Saudi Arabian port city of Jeddah during the middle of the 15th century. This Sultan's unwillingness to allow a slave to be punished for killing a Maldivian is the reason he is referenced once again in the historical narrative Ta'rikh.

Slaves had access to a variety of occupations outside lower caste employment. Some of them worked in the Sultan's guard. Only Africans were essentially subject to slavery.

The number of slaves being sent to Maldives after the 18th century was drastically decreased, and by the start of the 19th century, the already meager supply of African slaves had all but vanished.

Baburu Amina Fulu, who died in the 1940s, was the last first-generation slave of Maldives.

=== Charukeysi slaves ===
See Circassian slave trade

Slaves from Eastern Europe were known as Charukeysi (Circasian).

=== Local slaves ===
During the Middle Ages, several aristocratic families used local commoners as slaves and occasionally even sold them. During the rule of Sultan Mohamed Ibn Al-Hajj Ali Thukkalaa (r. 1692 – 1701), the situation changed.

=== Fulhû ===
Fulhu was a rank by affiliation. The name suggested ownership by a person of noble birth. In other words, Ahmed Fulhu as an example would be either a slave, a slave's ancestor, or a servant of the royal family.

Fulhu was the title given to those of the lowest status who joined the royal household for work or foreign slaves purchased by the great nobles and brought back to the Maldives from the slave markets of Arabia. Africans generally made up these slaves.

== Low caste ==
=== Giraavaru people ===
The most notable remnants of the old caste system may be seen among the few groups at the bottom of the social order. Giravarus is one such group.

Giraavaru people were compelled to leave their island in 1968. They were moved over to Male and housed in a few blocks on reclaimed grounds in the Maafanu neighborhood. They were assimilated with other social groups in Male'.

=== Raaverin ===
Working primarily as Raaverins, or keepers of coconut plantations, the slaves were eventually absorbed by several social groups or castes, most notably the Raaveri.

=== Low caste names ===
Names with suffix Kalo and Fulhu would be of lower class and would not have been welcomed in the presence of the monarch and nobility unless they were either servants or officials.

It is unlikely that a person with name suffix Kalo would have ever been permitted to enter the presence of royalty.

A name with suffix Maniku was lower middle class unless they inherited the name from upperclass.

== Upper caste ==
The complex social elite structure and the existence of the hereditary nobility are distinctive aspects of Maldivian society that also represent the remnants of a former caste system.

Despite being only fully visible in the capital, where the Sultan lived, the aristocracy was present in the southern Maldives.

=== Upper caste names ===
If the bearers of names with suffix Seedi and Didi were married to royalty or Kilege nobles, or if they were Kilege nobles or descended from them, then their names may have been considered to be of a higher social class. Otherwise those with such names were upper middle class.

Names with suffix Didi or Manikufanu in the southern provinces were of nobility
