= Ghaazee Bandaarain =

- Official film poster
- Directed by: Hussain Shihab (Part 1); Kashima Ahmed Shakir (Part 2)
- Written by: Kopee Mohamed Rasheed
- Screenplay by: Hussain Shihab (Part 1); Kashima Ahmed Shakir (Part 2)
- Produced by: Television Maldives
- Starring: Adam Zahir; Ibrahim Moosa; Ahmed Shakir; Abdul Rasheed Hassan; Zuhaira Umar; Chilhiya Moosa Manik
- Cinematography: Ali Waheed
- Edited by: Ali Qasim (Part 1); Hussain Rasheed (Part 2); Adam Latheef (Part 2)
- Production company: Television Maldives
- Release date: 1982
- Country: Maldives
- Language: Dhivehi

Ghaazee Bandaarain is a 1982 Maldivian historical film developed by Television Maldives in association with Tolour Productions. The film was released in three parts where the first two parts were directed by Hussain Shihab and Kashima Ahmed Shakir respectively. It stars Adam Zahir, Ibrahim Moosa, Ahmed Shakir, Abdul Rasheed Hassan, Zuhaira Umar and Chilhiya Moosa Manik in pivotal roles. The film narrates the journey of three war hero siblings, Muhammad Thakurufaanu, Ali Thakurufaanu and Hassan Thakurufaanu, whom with his companions fought an eight-year-long war to drive out the Portuguese invaders who occupied the Maldives from 1558 to 1573.

== Premise ==
=== Part 1 ===
On the occasion of Eid, Hussain Al Auzam Thakurufaan, a khatib from an influential family of Ha. Utheemu, due to his poor health condition sends in place of him, his three sons, Muhammad Thakurufaanu, Ali Thakurufaan and Hassan Thakurufaan to convey warm regards to Viyazor, a chief of Andiri Andirin residing in Ha. Baarah, the administrative capital of the four atolls to the North of Malé. On their way back home, Hassan Thakurufaanu approaches an underprivileged woman, Rehendhi who happily agrees to marry him. On a request by Viyazor, Hassan Thakurufaanu visits Baarah to build a boat, accompanied by a hyperactive shipwright, Dhandahelu from R. Dhuvaafaru. The Viyazor, married to Kanbaa Aysha Rani Kileygefaanu, widow of King Audha Siyaaka Katthiri, is under strict orders from Andhiri Andhirin to entertain all requests of the Thakurufaanu brothers. Sitti Maavaa Rani Kileygefaanu, the only daughter of Kanbaa Aysha Rani Kileygefaanu, with the help of Dhandahelu, makes a move on Mohamed Thakurufaanu.

=== Part 2 ===
Mohamed Thakurufaanu, Hassan Thakurufaanu and Dhandahelu returns from N. Holhudhoo which pleases Viyazor. A late night conversation with Dhandahelu and Kanbaa Aysha leads the former revealing Muhammad Thakurufaanu's intention to marry Sitti Maavaa Rani Kileygefaanu which Kanbaa Aysha rebuffs considering the difference in their social standards. She later accepts his proposal and sends Dhandahelu to convey her acceptance. Viyazor, seeks help from the Thakurufaanu brothers in treating his ill daughter-in-law. As days pass by, the Portuguese cruelty grows which builds a fear of danger for the lives of the Thakurufaanu brothers and other natives of the island. The part ends where the brothers discuss their plan to build the boat, Kalhuoffummi, which they determine to use in order to bring an end to their cruelty.

== Cast ==
- Adam Zahir as Muhammad Thakurufaanu
- Ibrahim Moosa as Ali Thakurufaanu
- Ahmed Shakir as Hassan Thakurufaanu
- Abbas Ibrahim as Hussain khatib Al Auzam Thakurufaanu
- Abdul Rasheed Hassan as Dhandahelu
- Zuhaira Umar as Kanbaa Aysha Rani Kileygefaanu
- Hafza Ali as Rehendhi
- Aminath Ibrahim as Sitti Maavaa Rani Kileygefaanu
- Mohamed Jameel as Thakurufaanu
- Chilhiya Moosa Manik as Viyazor
- Zahira as Hawwafulhu

== Development ==
Filming was completed in K. Huraa. Before releasing the film as a screen release, the story of the film as narrated by the historian Buraaree, was performed by several actors in theatre plays. Since 1977, actor Chilhiya Moosa Manik performs the character Viyazor in many of his theatre plays and impressed with his performance, he was chosen by the directors to play the same role in the film. The script of the film was based on the novel Bodu Thakurufaanu penned by Buraara Mohamed Fulhu. The project was initiated by the Ministry of Home Affairs.

== Soundtrack ==
The film does not have any song in it, rather an opening poem penned by Kopee Mohamed Rasheed.

Track listing
No.	Title	Lyrics	Length
1.	"Utheemu Thin Bein"	Kopee Mohamed Rasheed

== Release and reception ==
The film is noted as the first film released in Maldives though several articles contradicts the statement, crediting Thin Fiyavalhu (1982) for the same title Later, the. latter was classified as the first commercial film release in Maldives and the former as the first screened film in Maldives.

Upon release, the film received positive reviews from critics where each department of the project was applauded for their effort to present the historical events in its most authentic manner, given the limited equipment for production. The performances of Zuhaira Umar and Chilhiya Moosa Manik were particularly appreciated by the critics and audiences for their dialogue delivery and carefully crafting their respective characters as defined in history.
