= Muraidhoo =

Muraidhoo މުރައިދޫ
- island
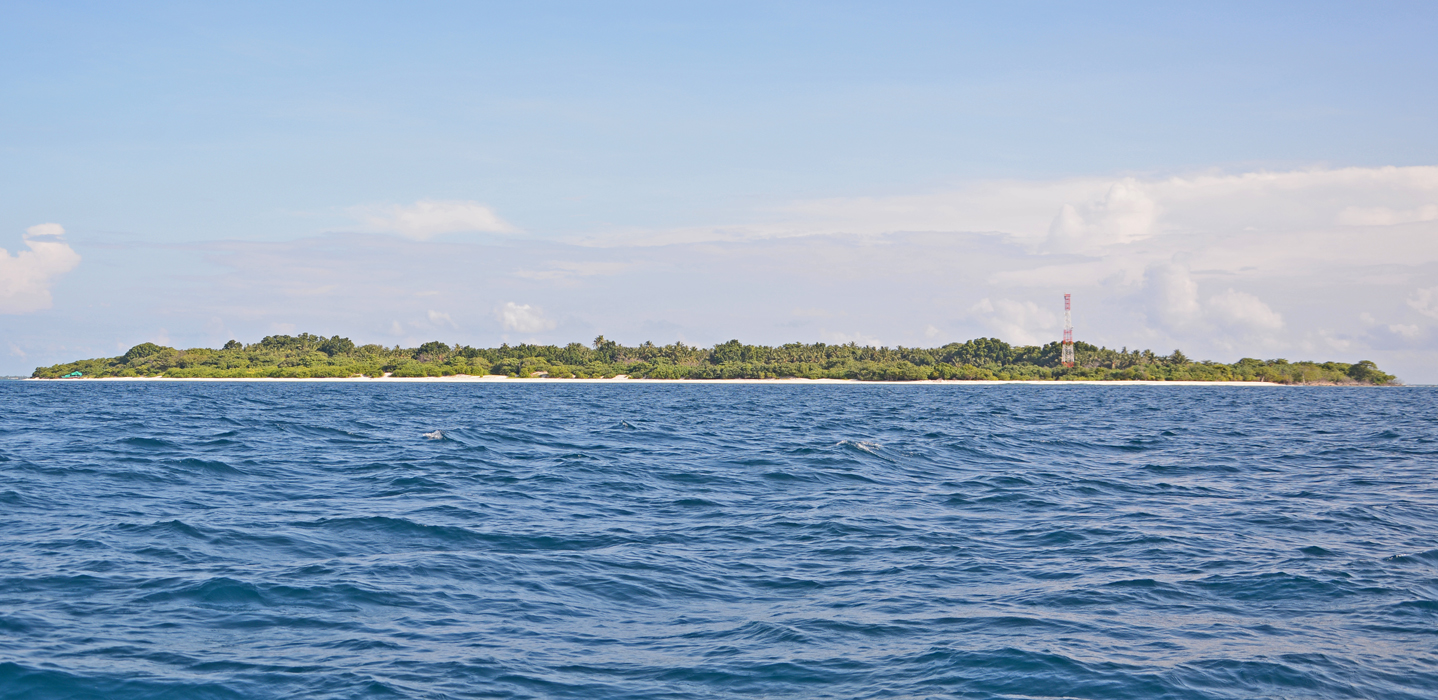

- Location in Maldives
- Coordinates: 6°50′23″N 73°09′54″E
- Country: Maldives
- Geographic atoll: Thiladhunmathi Atoll
- Administrative atoll: Haa Alif Atoll
- Distance to Malé: 297.1 km (184.6 mi)

Government
  - Council: Muraidhoo Island Council

Dimensions
  - Length: 1.05 km (0.65 mi)
  - Width: 0.68 km (0.42 mi)

Population (2022)
  - Total: 534
- Time zone: UTC+05:00 (MST)
- Area code(s): 650, 20

Muraidhoo (Dhivehi: މުރައިދޫ) is one of the inhabited islands of Haa Alif Atoll administrative division and is geographically part of Thiladhummathi Atoll in the north of the Maldives. It is an island-level administrative constituency governed by the Muraidhoo Island Council. It is one of the intra-atoll islands (i.e. not forming the atoll border).

== History ==
There are no archaeological remains of interest on the island. Notable figures from Muraidhoo include Hassan Kaleyge who served as the Treasurer of the Kings for many sultans of the Isdhoo and Dhiyamigili Dynastries and Hussein Dahara Takurufan who was the foreign minister during Sultan Ghazi Hassan Izudeen's reign 1759–1767.

== Geography ==
The island is 297.1 km (185 mi; 160 nmi) north of the country's capital, Malé.

== Demography ==
Historical population
Year	Pop.	±%
2006	451	—
2014	444	−1.6%
2022	534	+20.3%
2006-2014-2022: Census populations Source:
