= Thakandhoo =

Thakandhoo ތަކަންދޫ
- island
- Location in Maldives
- Coordinates: 6°50′44″N 72°59′38″E
- Country: Maldives
- Geographic atoll: Thiladhunmathi Atoll
- Administrative atoll: Haa Alif Atoll
- Distance to Malé: 300.75 km (186.88 mi)

Government
  - Council: Thakandhoo Island Council

Dimensions
  - Length: 1.22 km (0.76 mi)
  - Width: 0.46 km (0.29 mi)

Population (2022)
  - Total: 279
- Time zone: UTC+05:00 (MST)
- Area code(s): 650, 20

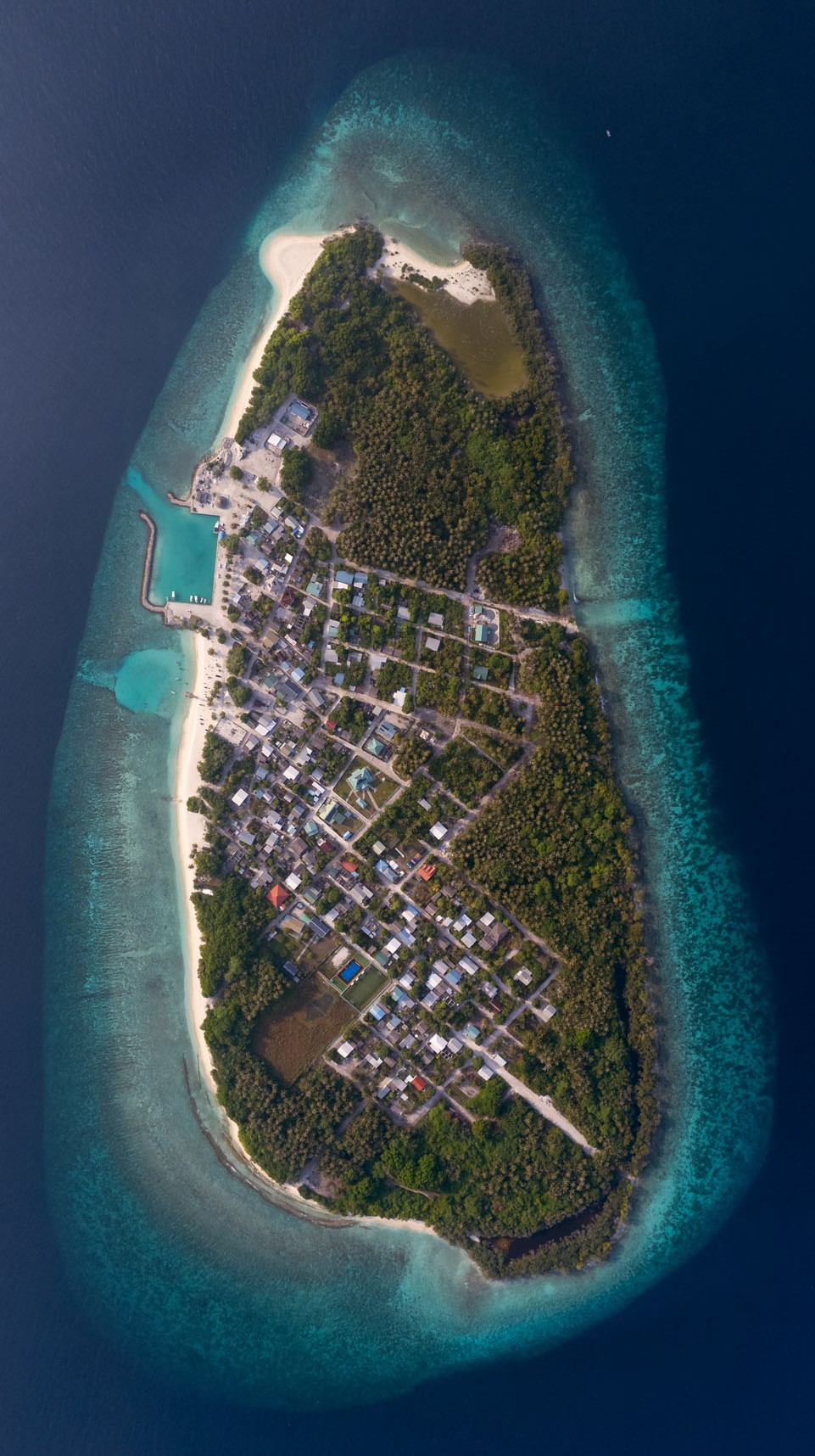
Aerial view of Thakandhoo

Thakandhoo (Dhivehi: ތަކަންދޫ) is one of the inhabited islands of Haa Alif Atoll administrative division and is geographically part of Thiladhummathi Atoll in the north of the Maldives. It is an island-level administrative constituency governed by the Thakandhoo Island Council.

== Geography ==
The island is 300.75 km (187 mi; 162 nmi) north of the country's capital, Malé. Thakandhoo is relatively small and flat, with no significant elevation, and is surrounded by a lagoon and coral reefs that help protect it from strong ocean currents. The island is characterized by its white sandy beaches, typical of Maldivian geography, and is covered with tropical vegetation, including coconut palms and other native plant species. The surrounding waters are rich in marine life, contributing to the local fishing economy. Thakandhoo's geographical features are typical of the low-lying islands of the Maldives, with its proximity to the coral reef playing a crucial role in protecting the island from erosion and supporting the biodiversity of the area.

== History ==
The tomb of Ali Thakurufaanu, who was killed in 1572 during a battle against the invading Portuguese, is located on this island. He was the first person to be killed in the 8-year war against the Portuguese led by Muhammad Thakurufaanu Al-Azam of Utheemu. The Malabars decapitated the body and took the head to Male' to ceremonially present to the regent Andiri Andirin. Maldivians later stole the head from the garrison and buried it in the island of Funadhoo. The body was later buried in Thakandhoo.

== Demography ==
Historical population
| Year | Pop. | ±% |
|---|---|---|
| 2006 | 340 | — |
| 2014 | 336 | −1.2% |
| 2022 | 279 | −17.0% |
2006-2014-2022: Census populations Source:
