= Berinmadhoo =

Berinmadhoo ބެރިންމަދޫ
- uninhabited island
- Location in Maldives
- Coordinates: 7°2′51″N 72°58′18″E
- Country: Maldives
- Geographic atoll: Ihavandhippolhu Atoll
- Administrative atoll: Haa Alif Atoll

Dimensions
  - Length: 0.65 km (0.40 mi)
  - Width: 0.32 km (0.20 mi)

Population
  - Total: 0
- Time zone: UTC+05:00 (MST)

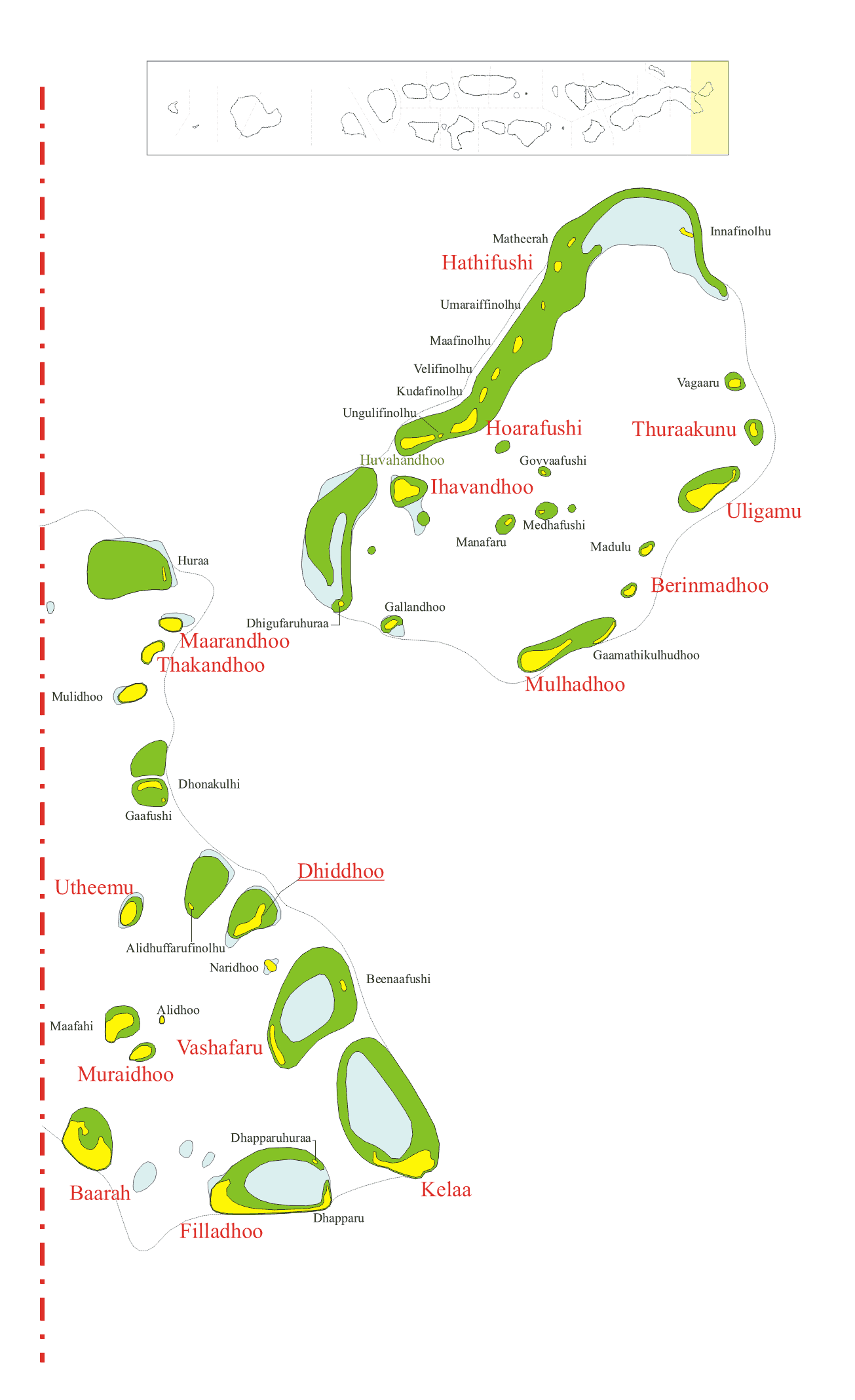
Map of the northern atolls of the Maldives, specifically Haa Alif Atoll (Thiladhunmathi Uthuruburi) and Haa Dhaalu Atoll (Thiladhunmathi Dhekunuburi). Originally vector'ed by Hassan Waheed, Aabaadhuge of Thinadhoo island.

Berinmadhoo (Dhivehi: ބެރިންމަދޫ) was one of the inhabited islands of Haa Alif Atoll and is geographically part of the Ihavandhippolhu Atoll in the Maldives.Berinmadhoo people have been relocated to the island of Hoarafushi in the same atoll under a population consolidation programme. Berinmadhoo was one of the non-smoking islands of the Maldives with a hefty fine levied on anyone caught smoking.

== Population Consolidation Programme ==
During the presidency of Ibrahim Nasir, the first relocation took place the islanders were relocated to Dhidhoo, however many of the islanders disagreed with the decision due to the limited land area of Dhidhoo and split up into different parts of the atoll some migrating as far as Raa atoll. A decade later as people were allowed to return to their home land few people went back and started repopulating. However, after some years into repopulation the government halted people from accessing land for housing (for 20 years) forcing, half of the people to migrate to male’ 174 people remained. Out of which only 40 people were living in the island. Due to the lack of facilities provided people started migrating to the nearby island Hoarafushi renting homes for educational purpose. Hence in the end there was no choice other than a relocation and a voting took place in corporation with the government and the inhabitants were relocated to the island Hoarafushi.Relocation took place after the Asian tsunami the government lied to the Red Crescent to get aid into building homes. People who were not fairly provided housing migrated to male’ and different corners of the country.

== Resort Island ==
In September 2007, the government presented the islands of Berinmadhoo and Hathifushi for tourism development. This is part of the plan to extend tourism in Maldives to the northern atolls. Berinmadhoo will be one of the first resort islands in the north of the country. The resort is currently under construction and is due to be completed by December 2011.
