= Molhadhoo =

Molhadhoo މޮޅަދޫ
- Island
- Location in Maldives
- Coordinates: 7°00′45″N 72°59′45″E
- Country: Maldives
- Geographic atoll: Ihavandhippolhu Atoll
- Administrative atoll: Haa Alif Atoll
- Distance to Malé: 318.86 km (198.13 mi)

Government
  - Council: Molhadhoo Island Council

Dimensions
  - Length: 2.6 km (1.6 mi)
  - Width: 0.84 km (0.52 mi)

Population (2022)
  - Total: 286
- Time zone: UTC+05:00 (MST)
- Area code(s): 650, 20

Molhadhoo (Dhivehi: މޮޅަދޫ) is one of the inhabited islands of Haa Alif Atoll and is geographically part of the Ihavandhippolhu Atoll in the Maldives. It is an island-level administrative constituency governed by the Molhadhoo Island Council.

== Geography ==
The island is 318.86 km (198 mi; 172 nmi) north of the country's capital, Malé.

=== Ecology ===
Half a century ago, Molhadhoo along with the neighbouring uninhabited island of Gaamathikulhudhoo, was famous for their nesting green sea turtles (Chelonia mydas), with over 20,000 nesting on its beaches every year. However the numbers have been in decline since then, amounting to less than 400 females coming ashore in 2001.

== Demography ==
Historical population
Year	Pop.	±%
2006	172	—
2014	369	+114.5%
2022	286	−22.5%
2006-2014-2022: Census populations Source:
