= Filladhoo =

Filladhoo ފިއްލަދޫ
- island
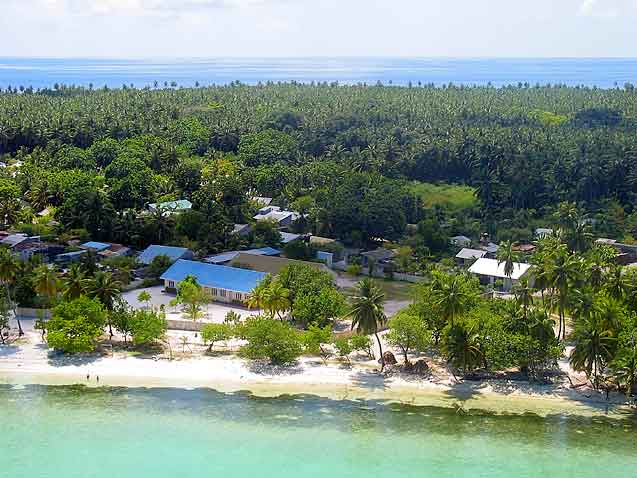
- An aerial view showcasing the island school and coastline

- Location in Maldives
- Coordinates: 6°52′38″N 73°13′39″E
- Country: Maldives
- Geographic atoll: Thiladhunmathi Atoll
- Administrative atoll: Haa Alif Atoll
- Distance to Malé: 300.42 km (186.67 mi)

Government
  - Council: Filladhoo Island Council

Area
  - Total: 2.49 km^{2} (0.96 sq mi)

Dimensions
  - Length: 5.85 km (3.64 mi)
  - Width: 1.45 km (0.90 mi)

Population (2022)
  - Total: 559
  - Density: 224/km^{2} (581/sq mi)
- Time zone: UTC+05:00 (MST)
- Area code(s): 650, 20

Filladhoo (Dhivehi: ފިއްލަދޫ) is one of the inhabited islands of Haa Alif Atoll and geographically part of Thiladhummathi Atoll in the north of the Maldives. It is an island-level administrative constituency governed by the Filladhoo Island Council.

== Geography ==
The island is 300.42 km (187 mi; 162 nmi) north of the country's capital, Malé. This island lies on a large reef and it has a large sandy projection that stretches northwards to Dhapparu, formerly a separate island.

== Important Bird Area ==
Haa Alifu Atoll, along with the adjacent reef waters, forms a 6,000 ha Important Bird Area (IBA), designated as such by BirdLife International because it supports a population of some 15,000 lesser noddies, as estimated in 2001.

== Demography ==
Historical population
Year	Pop.	±%
2006	548	—
2014	562	+2.6%
2022	559	−0.5%
2006-2022: Census populations Source:

== Services ==
=== Education ===
Madhrasathul Sobaah is the Government school in Filladhoo, providing primary and secondary education for the island. Established in 1998, it now has around 130 students.

=== Health ===
The island has a health center providing basic health facilities.
