= Maarandhoo (Haa Alif Atoll) =

Maarandhoo މާރަންދޫ
- island
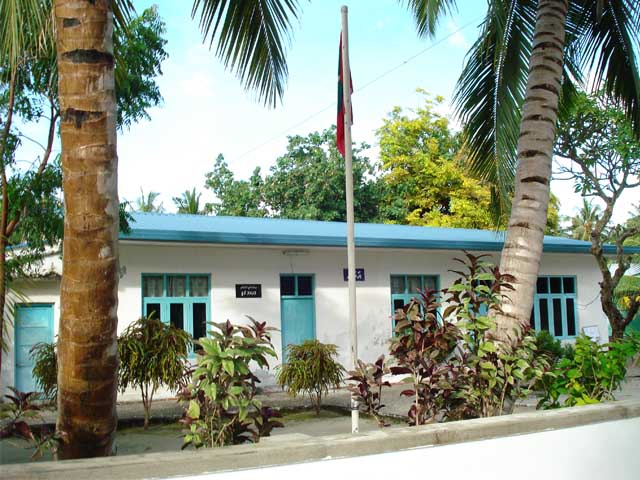
- Secretariat for Maarandhoo Island Council

- Location in Maldives
- Coordinates: 6°51′18″N 72°58′59″E
- Country: Maldives
- Geographic atoll: Thiladhunmathi Atoll
- Administrative atoll: Haa Alif Atoll
- Distance to Malé: 302.01 km (187.66 mi)

Government
  - Council: Maarandhoo Island Council

Dimensions
  - Length: 1.08 km (0.67 mi)
  - Width: 0.52 km (0.32 mi)

Population (2022)
  - Total: 668
- Time zone: UTC+05:00 (MST)
- Area code(s): 650, 20

Maarandhoo (Dhivehi: މާރަންދޫ) is one of the inhabited islands of Haa Alif Atoll and is geographically part of Thiladhummathi Atoll in the north of the Maldives. It is an island-level administrative constituency governed by the Maarandhoo Island Council.

== Geography ==
The island is 302.01 km (188 mi; 163 nmi) north of the country's capital, Malé.

== Demography ==
Historical population
Year	Pop.	±%
2006	530	—
2014	647	+22.1%
2022	668	+3.2%
2006-2014-2022: Census populations Source:
