= Medhafushi =

Medhafushi as a place name may refer to:

- Medhafushi (Haa Alif Atol) (Republic of Maldives)
- Medhafushi (Laamu Atoll) (Republic of Maldives)
- Medhafushi (Lhaviyani Atoll) (Republic of Maldives)
- Medhafushi (Noonu Atoll) (Republic of Maldives)
- Medhafushi (Thaa Atoll) (Republic of Maldives)
- Medhafushi (Alif Dhaal Atoll) (Republic of Maldives)
