= Hathifushi =

Hathifushi may refer to the following places in the Maldives:

- Hathifushi (Haa Alif Atoll)
- Hathifushi (Thaa Atoll), on Kolhumadulu Atoll
