= Kudafinolhu =

Kudafinolhu may refer to the following places in the Maldives:

- Kudafinolhu (Haa Alif Atoll)
- Kudafinolhu (Kaafu Atoll)
