= Maarandhoo =

Maarandhoo may refer to the following places in the Maldives:

- Maarandhoo (Haa Alif Atoll)
- Maarandhoo (Gaafu Alif Atoll)
