= Hoarafushi =

Hoarafushi ހޯރަފުށި
- island
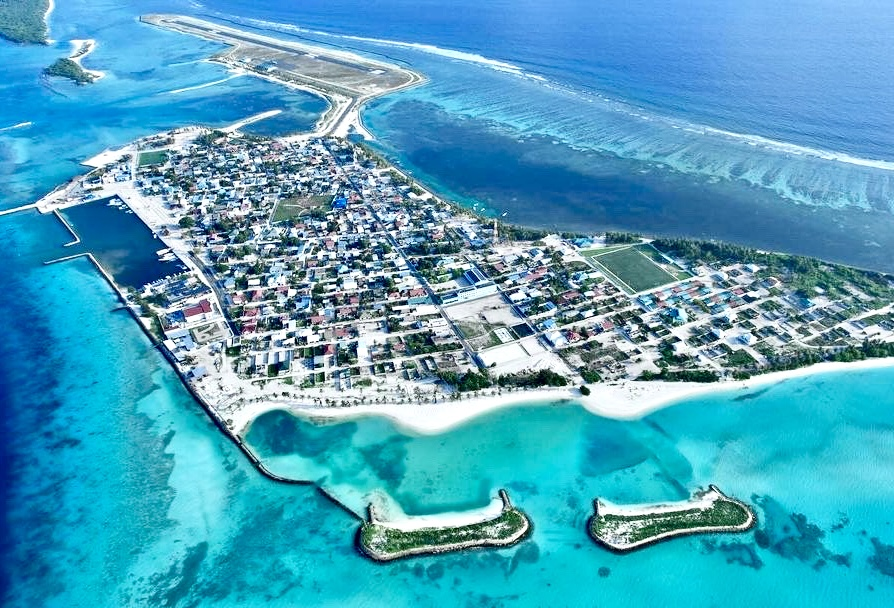
- An aerial view of the island

- Location in Maldives
- Coordinates: 6°58′50″N 72°53′45″E
- Country: Maldives
- Geographic atoll: Ihavandhippolhu Atoll
- Administrative atoll: Haa Alif Atoll
- Distance to Malé: 317.57 km (197.33 mi)

Government
  - Council: Secretariat of the Hoarafushi Council

Dimensions
  - Length: 1.75 km (1.09 mi)
  - Width: 0.45 km (0.28 mi)

Population (2025)
  - Total: 3,613 (excluding foreigners)
- Time zone: UTC+05:00 (MST)
- Area code(s): 650, 20

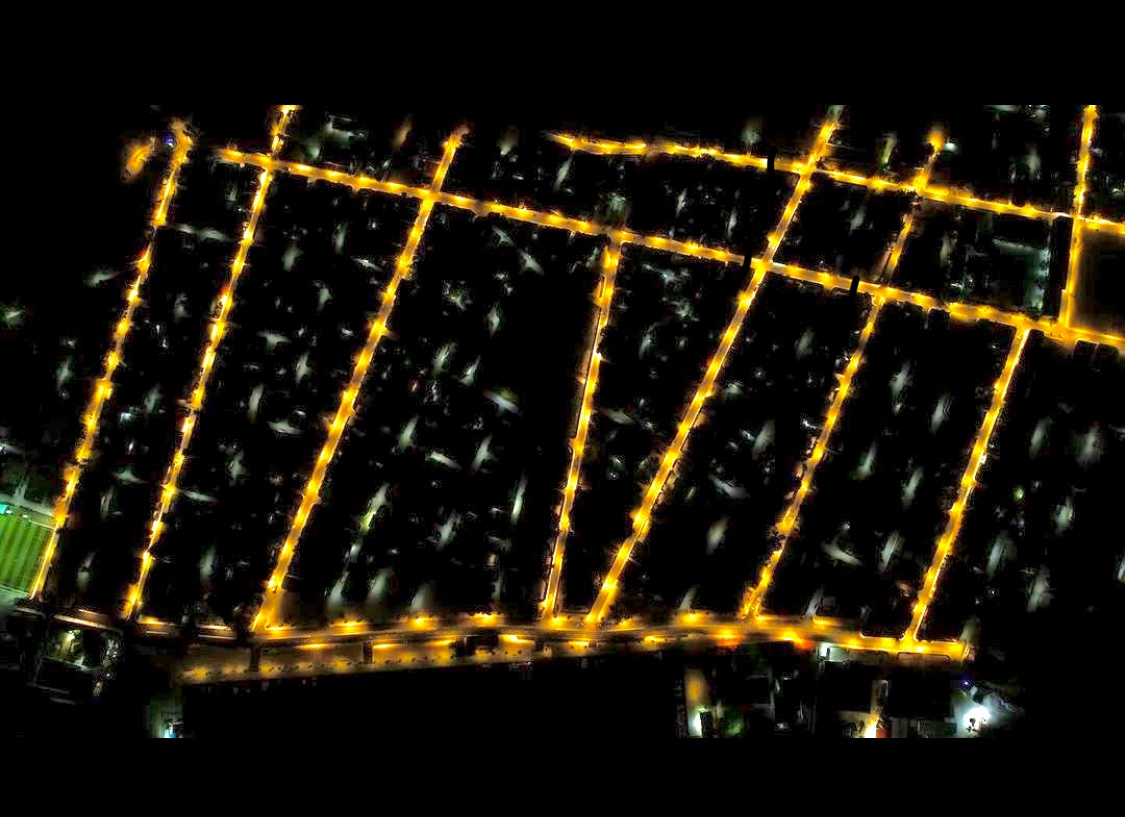
Night View of Hoarafushi

Hoarafushi (Dhivehi: ހޯރަފުށި) is an inhabited island of Haa Alif Atoll, Maldives, and is geographically part of the Ihavandhippolhu Atoll. The island has a history dating back approximately 300 years when the inhabitants of nearby Huvahandhoo migrated and established a settlement. It is an island-level administrative constituency governed by the Hoarafushi Island Council.

== History ==
The island is named after the great frigatebird, known as the hoara in Dhivehi, which used to be seen there.

According to the 1912 census, Hoarafushi was the fourth-largest locality in the Maldives, with a population of 1,811. The island used to be an educational hub. The people of Hoarafushi claim to have originated from Gudhanfushi, a vanished island adjacent to Huvahandhoo in the same reef. The population moved to Huvuhandhoo as Gudhanfushi eroded away before moving onto Hoarafushi. In 2006 the inhabitants of Berinmadhoo were relocated to Hoarafushi.

== Geography ==
Hoarafushi is located at the northern most Ihavandhippolhu Atoll. The island is situated within the largest fringing reef of Maldives extending over 22 km. Hoarafushi consist of 3 islands naturally joined the main island Hoarafushi adjacent to Bodufinolhu connected in the late (1700) and Kudafinolhu in (2013). The island has a land area of 105 hectares. 317.57 km (197 mi; 171 nmi) north of the country's capital, Malé.

== Aviation Academy ==
The Regional Airports Company (RACL) inaugurated an Aviation Academy on Ha. Hoarafushi, Maldives, featuring the country's first automatic fire simulator. Named the Ahmed Fayaz Fire Simulator after former RACL Fire and Safety Director Ahmed Fayaz, the academy aims to provide comprehensive aviation programs sanctioned by the Maldives Civil Aviation Authority, including civil aviation-approved certificate courses. Basic firefighting courses commenced in July 2022, with plans to expand training to aircraft rescue, firefighting, and emergency medical services.

== Population ==
Historical population
Year	Pop.	±%
1912	1,811	—
1921	1,171	−35.3%
1931	1,602	+36.8%
1985	1,650	+3.0%
1990	1,995	+20.9%
1995	2,098	+5.2%
2000	2,221	+5.9%
2006	2,204	−0.8%
2014	3,291	+49.3%
2016	3,388	+2.9%
2018	4,379	+29.3%
2019	4,500	+2.8%
2022	3,561	−20.9%
2025	3,613	+1.5%
1911-2014-2016-2019-2021: Census populations Source:

== Education ==
The Hoarafushi island has 4 well known educational institutions.

1. H.a Atoll School (ހ.އ އަތޮޅު މަދަރުސާ), a government manipulated educational institution. (LKG to Grade 12)
2. Avid International Preschool opened in 2025
1. Thauleemul Bayaan (ތައުލީމުލް ބަޔާން), a private educational institution mainly focused on Qur'an Studies.
2. Novel Institute of Technology offers IT courses
