= Baarah =

Baarah ބާރަށް
- island
- Location in Maldives
- Coordinates: 6°49′8″N 73°12′30″E
- Country: Maldives
- Geographic atoll: Thiladhunmathi Atoll
- Administrative atoll: Haa Alif Atoll
- Distance to Malé: 294.23 km (182.83 mi)

Government
  - Council: Baarah Island Council

Dimensions
  - Length: 2.4 km (1.5 mi)
  - Width: 1.5 km (0.93 mi)

Population (2022)
  - Total: 1,141 (including foreigners)
- Time zone: UTC+05:00 (MST)
- Area code(s): 650, 20

Baarah (Dhivehi: ބާރަށް) is an inhabited island in Haa Alif Atoll in the northern Maldives. It is an island-level administrative constituency governed by the Baarah Island Council.

== History ==
Historically, Baarah was the island where the vessel Kalhuohfummi was built in the latter half of the 16th century. The ship played a key role in Sultan Muhammad Thakurufaanu's war against the Portuguese invasion of the country. The sails of the ship were made on the island of Maroshi further south.

== Geography ==
The island is 294.23 km (183 mi; 159 nmi) north of the country's capital, Malé. The island is shaped like the letter 'ب 'in Arabic.

=== Ecology ===
A large part of the shores are covered by a mangroves predominantly occupied by Rhizophora mucronata and Hibiscus tiliaceus. The soil around these areas is rich in hydrogen sulphide and is often avoided by islanders. The ecosystem is under threat due to logging, garbage dumping and poor management.

== Demography ==
Now, the population has increased to 2000.

Historical population
Year	Pop.	±%
2006	1,203	—
2014	1,181	−1.8%
2022	1,141	−3.4%
2006-2022: Census populations Source:
