= Uligan =

Uligan އުލިގަން
- island
- Location in Maldives
- Coordinates: 7°05′00″N 72°55′40″E
- Country: Maldives
- Geographic atoll: Ihavandhippolhu Atoll
- Administrative atoll: Haa Alif Atoll
- Distance to Malé: 327.97 km (203.79 mi)

Government
  - Council: Uligan Island Council

Dimensions
  - Length: 2.5 km (1.6 mi)
  - Width: 0.8 km (0.50 mi)

Population (2022)
  - Total: 400
- Time zone: UTC+05:00 (MST)
- Area code(s): 1283

Uligan or Uligamu (Dhivehi: އުލިގަން) is one of the inhabited islands of Haa Alif Atoll and geographically part of the Ihavandhippolhu Atoll in the Maldives. It is an island-level administrative constituency governed by the Uligan Island Council.

== Demography ==
Historical population
Year	Pop.	±%
2006	267	—
2014	368	+37.8%
2022	400	+8.7%
2006-2014-2022: Census populations Source:

== Geography ==
The island is 327.97 km (204 mi; 177 nmi) north of the country's capital, Malé. Uligan is an outpost in the northwest Indian Ocean. It is the final stop most people make on the way from Thailand before they enter the Gulf of Aden or sail directly up the Red Sea.

== Economy ==
One of the major sources of income for the islanders is by selling souvenirs and ship provisions for passing yachtsmen.

An airport is planned to be built on this island, to serve Haa Alif Atoll.

=== Energy Production ===
Maldives made history with the implementation of the world's first hybrid AC Coupled Renewable Energy Micro Grid in Uligan that will help reduce the dependence on fossil fuel and toxic emissions, which in turn will contribute to reduce the effects of climate change.

- Hours of Electricity: 24hrs
- Generators: 6
- Wind Turbines: 24
- Solar Panels: 12
- Batteries: 120
