= Ihavandhoo =

Ihavandhoo އިހަވަންދޫ
- island
- Location in Maldives
- Coordinates: 6°57′17″N 72°55′33″E
- Country: Maldives
- Geographic atoll: Ihavandhippolhu Atoll
- Administrative atoll: Haa Alif Atoll
- Distance to Malé: 314.08 km (195.16 mi)

Government
  - Council: Ihavandhoo Island Council

Dimensions
  - Length: 0.88 km (0.55 mi)
  - Width: 0.86 km (0.53 mi)

Population (2025)
  - Total: 3,767
- Time zone: UTC+05:00 (MST)
- Area code(s): 750, 20

Ihavandhoo is an island of Ihavandhippolhu Atoll. It is located in the northernmost geographic atoll in the country, and is administratively part of Haa Alif Atoll. It is an Atoll-island-level administrative constituency governed by the Ihavandhoo Island Council .

== History ==
The story of Mohamed Thakurufaanu (Boduthankurufaanu), the Maldivian hero who defeated the Portuguese rule in Maldives, reveals that mother of Mohamed Thakurufaanu was an Ihavandhoo lady. The island has a mosque built by Sultan Ibrahim Muhirudheen in 1701 using brain corals. Through restorations, its origin is maintained as the mosque is the only remaining archaeological evidence in Ihavandhoo island.

Ihavandhoo Health Centre, a 50-bed hospital, was established in 2003.

== Geography ==
The island is 314.08 km (195 mi; 170 nmi) north of the country's capital, Malé.

One of the major environmental problems faced by Ihavandhoo islanders has been soil erosion.

== Demography ==
Historical population
Year	Pop.	±%
2006	2,547	—
2014	3,627	+42.4%
2016	1,007	−72.2%
2019	2,054	+104.0%
2021	3,089	+50.4%
2022	2,873	−7.0%
2006-2014-2016-2019-2021-2022: Census populations Source:

== Economy ==
Traditionally, the island has been a pure fishing island, with the majority of the working age group being experienced fishermen. Ihavandhoo also accounts for the country's export of tuna (chilled and frozen) and dried fish. The government owned fisheries company, Maldives Industrial Fisheries Company also operates in the region.

== Education ==
Opened on 14 May 1969, Ihavandhoo School serves as the public school in the island, providing primary to higher secondary education. Initially, the school was named "Ihavandhoo Madharusaa", when it was owned by the local people. The school started offering secondary grades in 1998, preparing students for international GCE Ordinary Level examinations, with A-Level grades in 2003. The school became a government owned school in 2000.

== Transport ==
A harbour has been dug to solve the problem of getting into the island. An area of 13,150 m^{2} (141,500 sq ft) was dredged in 1992. The harbour was repaired in 2000. This harbour plays an important role in the economy of the island especially the fact that majority of the islands working population are fishermen who had to use the harbour every day.

On 11 November 2010, the government started a project costing US$4,490,678.94 to build a new harbour. The project is yet to be finished. According to MTCC, the contractor of the project, as of 7 September 2011, 36% of breakwater construction has been completed. This new harbour has an area of 35,945 m^{2} (386,910 sq ft).
