= Utheemu =

Utheemu އުތީމު
- island
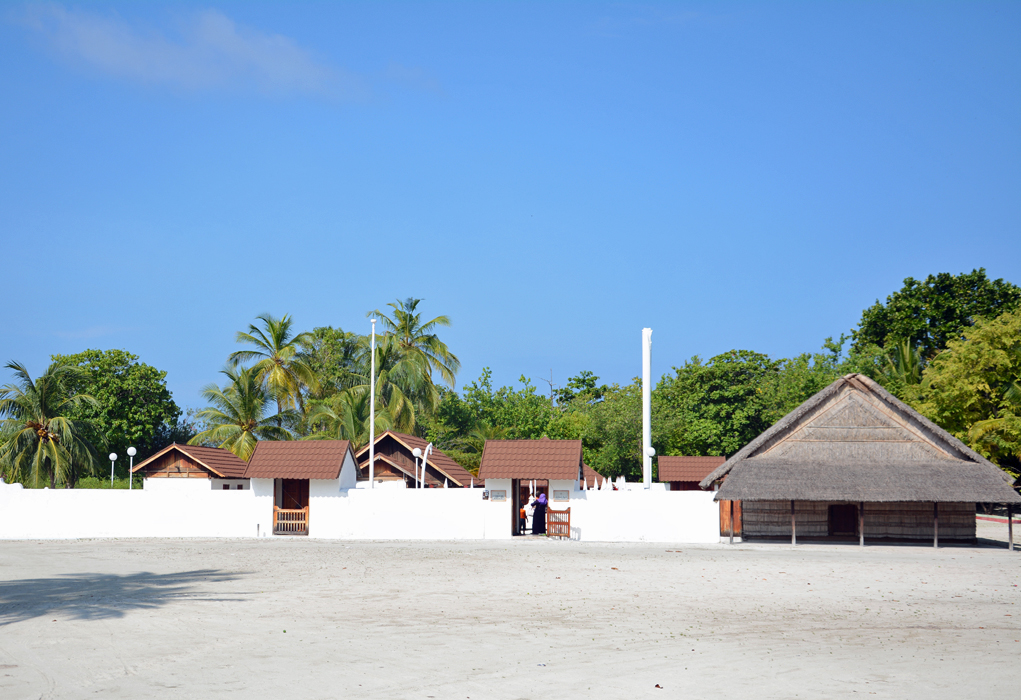
- Utheemu Ganduvaru- the historic residence of Sultan Mohamed Thakurufaanu and other rulers of the Utheemu Dynasty

- Location in Maldives
- Coordinates: 6°50′4″N 73°06′47″E
- Country: Maldives
- Geographic atoll: Thiladhunmathi Atoll
- Administrative atoll: Haa Alif Atoll
- Distance to Malé: 297.32 km (184.75 mi)

Government
  - Council: Utheemu Island Council

Dimensions
  - Length: 0.9 km (0.56 mi)
  - Width: 0.73 km (0.45 mi)

Population (2022)
  - Total: 612
- Time zone: UTC+05:00 (MST)
- Area code(s): 650, 20

Utheemu (Dhivehi: އުތީމު) is one of the inhabited islands of Haa Alif Atoll administrative division and geographically part of Thiladhummathi Atoll in the north of the Maldives. It is an island-level administrative constituency governed by the Utheemu Island Council.

== History ==
Utheemu is famed as the birthplace of Sultan Mohamed Thakurufaanu, who with his brothers and his companions fought a fifteen-year-long war to drive out the Portuguese who occupied the Maldives from 1558 to 1573. Utheemu Ganduvaru is the wooden palace in which Sultan Mohamed Thakurufaanu lived and grew up in.

The kings of the Utheemu Dynasty, Sultans Muhammed Imaduddin I (1632 to 1648 AD), Ibrahim Iskandar I (1648 to 1687 AD), Kuda Muhammad (1687 to 1691 AD) and Mohammed Moheyeddin (1691 to 1692 AD) all descended from this island. Regents from Utheem also ruled the Maldives from 1573 to 1632 AD, but the de facto kings of the islands during this period were the exiled Christian Kings of the Maldives residing in Goa, India.

From 1602 to 1607, a French sailor, François Pyrard de Laval spent time on the Maldives, and gave a detailed account of the customs of the islanders during the Utheemu dynasty. His three-volume work was published in 1619 and is considered a valuable historical archive.

== Geography ==
The island is 297.32 km (185 mi; 161 nmi) north of the country's capital, Malé.

== Demography ==
Historical population
Year	Pop.	±%
2006	521	—
2014	538	+3.3%
2022	612	+13.8%
2006-2014-2022: Census populations Source:

== Gallery ==
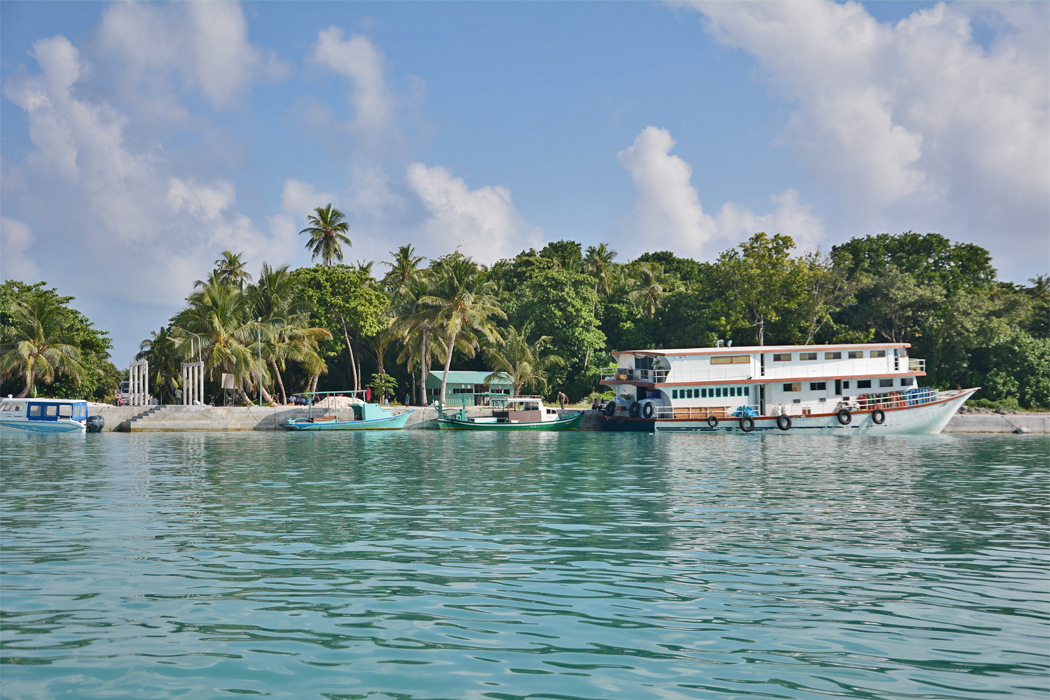
Harbor

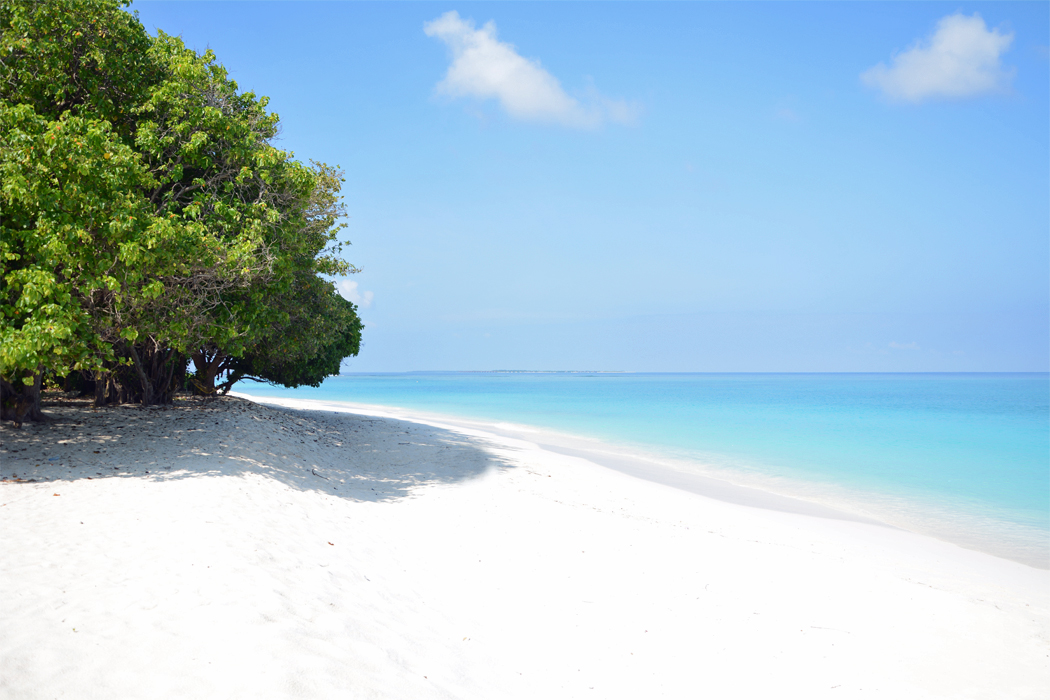
Beach, north shore

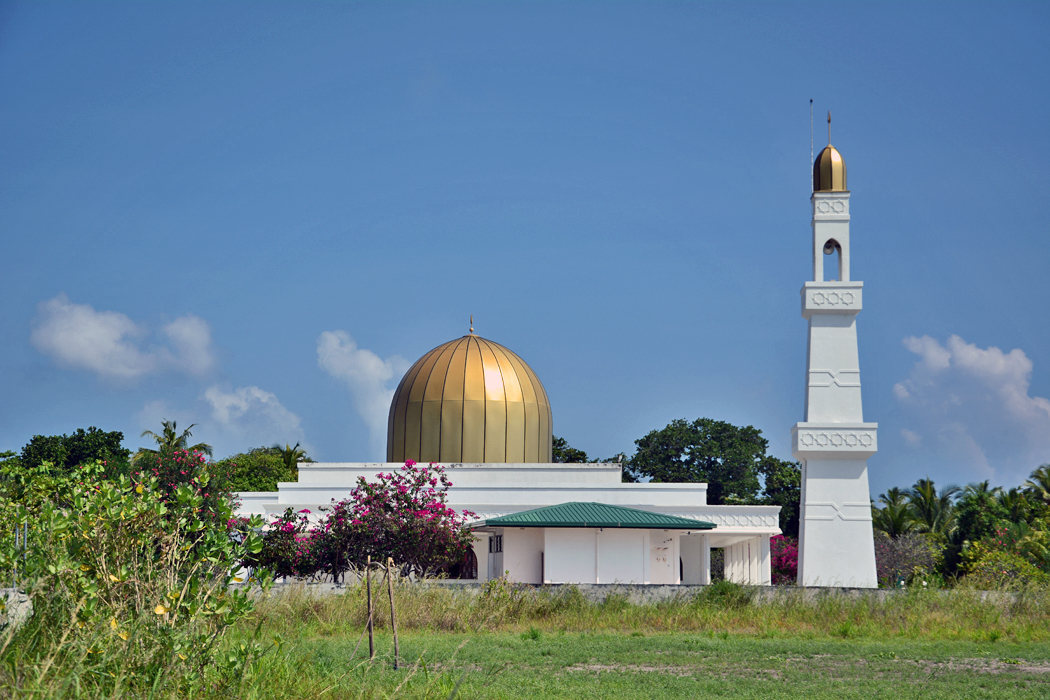
New mosque

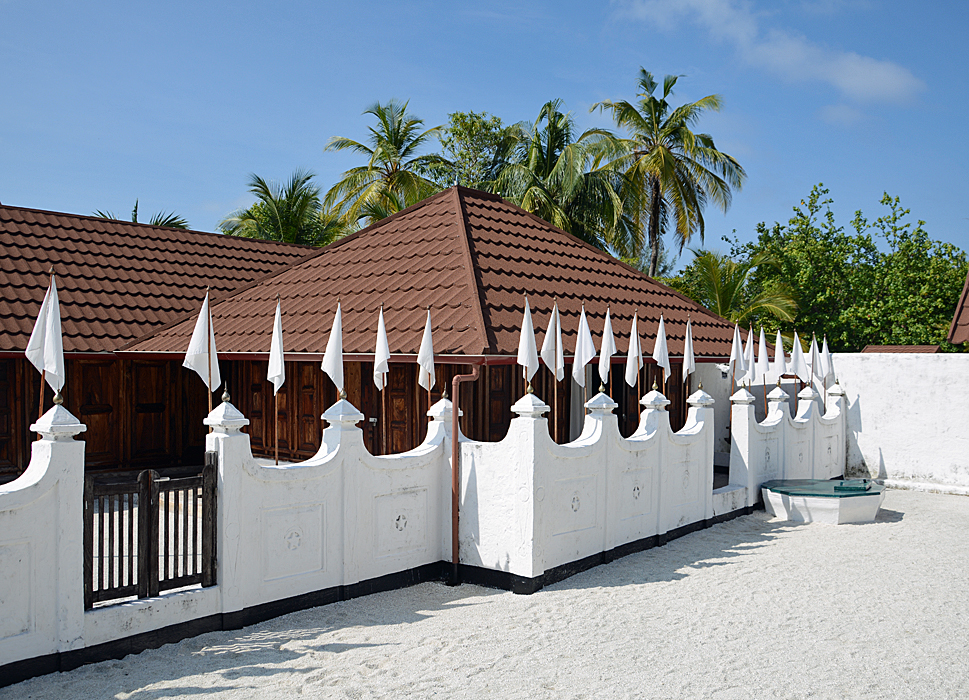
Utheemu Ganduvaru residence

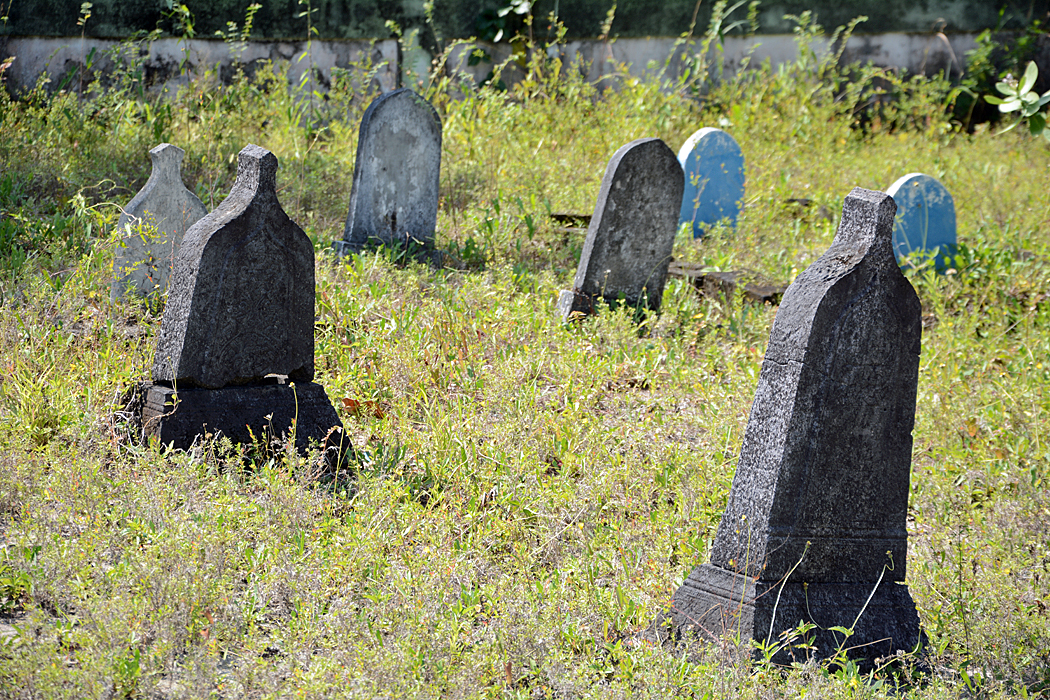
Ancient cemetery
