= Manafaru =

Resort island within Haa Alifu Atoll, Republic of Maldives

Coordinates: 6.9967°N 72.9403°E

JA Manafaru is one of only two resort islands within Haa Alifu Atoll, Republic of Maldives. It is the northernmost resort island in the Maldives, found in the most northerly atoll in the archipelago. It has been the 5-star luxury resort "JA Manafaru", since 2014 a resort with 84 villas, including three private residences and seven food and beverage outlets, plus dining. Every villa has a pool (some with two), and there are watersports, scuba diving, and recreational activities, as well as spa and wellness facilities. The resort concentrates on the natural aspects of the island as well as the cultural and historical importance of the area. The owning family opened the property in 2014 under the JA brand and JA Manafaru employs predominantly from the local community. It also has the very first wine cave in Maldives called 'The Cellar'. This cave is 2.5meters underground, boasting three rooms and to date is still the largest and deepest in Maldives. Several luxury brands have run the island previously, including the Beach House (a Waldorf Astoria hotel). The island is now owned and operated by the Emirates based Hospitality Group JA Resorts and Hotels LLC.
