= Hathifushi (Haa Alif Atoll) =

- uninhabited island
- Location within Maldives
- Coordinates: 7°1′12″N 72°49′49″E
- Country: Maldives
- Administrative atoll: Haa Alif Atoll
- Distance to Malé: 322.37 km (200.31 mi)

Dimensions
  - Length: 0.270 km (0.168 mi)
  - Width: 0.170 km (0.106 mi)

Population
  - Total: 260
- Time zone: UTC+05:00 (MST)

Hathifushi (Dhivehi: ހަތިފުށި) was one of the inhabited islands of Haa Alif Atoll and is geographically part of the Ihavandhippolhu Atoll in the Maldives. It was abandoned in 2007 by its resident community of 295 residents following storm surges. This community had been requesting relocation for decades prior.

Hathifushi people now live in the island of Hanimaadhoo in Haa Dhaalu atoll. Before the relocation, Hathifushi was one of the non-smoking islands of the Maldives with the island chief levying a fine of Rf5,000 (approx. US$400) on any person if proven to commit an act of smoking. The other non-smoking islands of Maldives are Berinmadhoo, Nolhivaranfaru, and Madifushi.
