= Haa Alif Atoll =

Atoll of the Maldives

Thiladhunmathi Uthuruburi ތިލަދުންމަތީ އުތުރުބުރި
- atoll of the Maldives
- Haa Alif Atoll
- Utheemu Ganduvaru in Utheemu Island.

- Haa Alif Atoll in Maldives.
- Country: Maldives
- Seat: Dhidhdhoo
- Geographic atolls: 2 atolls: Ihavandhippolhu; North Thiladhunmathi

Government
  - Council: North Thiladhunmathi Atoll Council

Population (2022)
  - Total: 24,598
- Time zone: UTC+05:00 (MST)
- Assigned Letter: HA
- (Dhivehi): ހއ
- Area code(s): 650, 20
- ISO 3166 code: MV-07
- Inhabited: 14 -: Baarah; Dhidhdhoo; Filladhoo; Hoarafushi; Ihavandhoo; Kelaa; Maarandhoo; Mulhadhoo; Muraidhoo; Thakandhoo; Thuraakunu; Uligamu; Utheemu; Vashafaru
- Uninhabited: 29 -: Alidhoo; Alidhuffarufinolhu; Beenaafushi; Berinmadhoo; Dhapparuhura; Dhigufaruhura; Dhonakulhi; Gaafushi; Gaamathikulhudhoo; Gallandhoo; Govvaafushi; Hathifushi; Huvahandhoo; Innafinolhu; Kandaalifinolhu; Kudafinolhu; Maafahi; Maafinolhu; Maarandhoofarufinolhu; Madulu; Manafaru; Matheerah; Medhafushi; Mulidhoo; Naridhoo; Umareifinolhu; Un'gulifinolhu; Van'gaaru; Velifinolhu
- Total: 43
- Website: Haa Alif Atoll

Haa Alif Atoll is the code name based on the letters of the Maldivian alphabet commonly used to refer to the administrative division officially known as Northern Thiladhunmathi Atoll (Maldivian: Thiladhunmathi Uthuruburi) in the Maldives.

It is the northernmost of the 19 administrative divisions (known as "Atolls") of the country, and is the third-largest administrative division in terms of population and land area.

This administrative division consists of Ihavandhippolhu, the northernmost geographical atoll of the Maldive archipelago, and the northern section of Thiladhunmathi atoll. The capital of North Thiladhunmathi Atoll is the island of Dhidhdhoo where the Secretariat of North Thiladhunmathi Atoll Council is located.

== Geography ==
The Northern Thiladhunmathi Atoll administrative division consists of a total of 43 islands spread over two natural geographic atolls, namely Northern Thiladhunmathi, and Ihavandhippolhu.

Northern Thiladhunmathi is the northernmost portion of the huge Thiladhunmathi Atoll. Thiladhunmathi Atoll was administratively divided into northern and southern divisions in 1958.

Ihavandhippolhu lies to the north of Northern Thiladhunmathi, with the Ihavandhoo Kandu channel separating the two, and is the northernmost atoll of the Maldives. It is a small natural atoll 22 km in length. It has 25 islands lying all around the boundary reef. One long barrier reef forms the western side of the atoll. There are several coral patches in the lagoon and the general depth in the centre is 20 to 30 fathoms (35 to 55 m).

Ihavandhippolhu is separated from the Lakshadweep Islands of India by the broad channel known as Māmalē Kandu (or Maliku Kandu).

Ihavandhippolhu Atoll (left) and Northern Thiladhunmathi Atoll (right)

== Islands ==
Of the 43 islands in the North Thiladhunmathi Atoll administrative division, 14 of them are inhabited and are classified as administrative island constituencies. Each of these constituencies have an island council which responds to the North Thiladhunmathi Atoll Council which has its headquarters on Dhidhdhoo.

=== Island constituencies ===
Name	Population (2025)	Education	Health	Political ward	Coordinates	Geographic Atoll	Remarks
Baarah	2,147	K-10	1 health centre	A03 Baarah	6°49′8″N 73°12′30″E	North Thiladhunmati	
Dhidhdhoo	4,736	K-11	1 hospital	A04 Dhidhdhoo	6°53′24″N 73°6′44″E	North Thiladhunmati	Capital of North Thiladhunmati Atoll
Filladhoo	1,193	K-10	1 health centre	A05 Kelaa	6°52′38″N 73°13′39″E	North Thiladhunmati	
Hoarafushi	3,642	K-12	1 health centre	A01 Hoarafushi	6°58′50″N 72°53′45″E	Ihavandhippolhu	
Ihavandhoo	3,787	K-12	1 Hospital	A02 Ihavandhoo	6°57′17″N 72°55′33″E	Ihavandhippolhu	
Kelaa	2,467	K-10	1 health centre	A05 Kelaa	6°57′35″N 73°12′46″E	North Thiladhunmati	
Maarandhoo	1,131	K-10	1 health centre	A02 Ihavandhoo	6°51′18″N 72°58′59″E	Ihavandhippolhu	
Mulhadhoo	420	K-8	1 health provider	A02 Ihavandhoo	7°00′45″N 72°59′45″E	Ihavandhippolhu	
Muraidhoo	934	K-10	1 health centre	A03 Baarah	6°50′23″N 73°09′54″E	North Thiladhunmati	
Thakandhoo	960	K-9	1 health centre	A03 Baarah	6°50′44″N 72°59′38″E	North Thiladhunmati	
Thuraakunu	703	K-10	1 health centre	A01 Hoarafushi	7°06′18″N 72°54′07″E	Ihavandhippolhu	Northernmost island in the country.
Uligamu	561	K-10	1 health centre	A01 Hoarafushi	7°05′00″N 72°55′40″E	Ihavandhippolhu	
Utheemu	1020	K-10	1 health centre	A03 Baarah	6°50′04″N 73°06′47″E	North Thiladhunmati	Location of iconic Utheemu Ganduvaru.
Vashafaru	951	K-12	1 health centre	A05 Kelaa	6°53′50″N 73°09′40″E	North Thiladhunmati	

=== Uninhabited Islands ===
All uninhabited islands in Haa Alif Atoll are under the control of the North Thiladhunmathi Atoll Council.

== Resort Islands ==
Name	Resort Name	Coordinates	Geographical Atoll	Remarks
Manafaru	JA Manafaru,	6°59′49″N 72°56′23″E	Ihavandhippolhu	Previous resort was The Beach House Iruveli (Waldorf Astoria Maldives)
Berinmadhoo	Construction in progress	7°02′50″N 72°58′16″E	Ihavandhippolhu	Was previously inhabited. Population relocated to Hoarafushi.
Dhonakulhi	Hideaway Beach Resort & Spa Maldives	6°50′35″N 73°03′05″E	North Thiladhunmati	
Alidhoo	J Resort Alidhoo	6°50′55″N 73°09′07″E	North Thiladhunmati	

Other Uninhabited Islands

Name	Current usage	Coordinates	Geographical Atoll	Remarks
Alidhuffarufinolhu	-	6°51′39″N 73°06′16″E	North Thiladhunmati	
Beenaafushi	-	6°55′42″N 73°08′11″E	North Thiladhunmati	
Dhapparuhura	-	6°54′55″N 73°12′40″E	North Thiladhunmati	
Dhigufaruhura	-	6°55′26″N 72°58′08″E	North Thiladhunmati	
Gaafushi	-	6°51′07″N 73°03′27″E	North Thiladhunmati	
Gaamathikulhudhoo	-	7°02′21″N 72°59′04″E	Ihavandhippolhu	
Gallandhoo	-	6°56′48″N 72°58′59″E	Ihavandhippolhu	
Govvaafushi	-	7°00′45″N 72°55′09″E	Ihavandhippolhu	
Hathifushi	-	7°01′12″N 72°49′49″E	Ihavandhippolhu	Was previously inhabited. Population relocated to Hanimaadhoo.
Huvahandhoo	-	6°57′32″N 72°54′18″E	Ihavandhippolhu	
Innafinolhu	-	7°04′25″N 72°48′40″E	Ihavandhippolhu	
Kandaalifinolhu	-	6°55′35″N 73°07′48″E	North Thiladhunmati	
Kudafinolhu	-	6°59′22″N 72°53′00″E	Ihavandhippolhu	
Maafahi	Fisheries	6°49′42″N 73°09′23″E	North Thiladhunmati	Leased for long-term fisheries and agriculture.
Maafinolhu	-	7°00′08″N 72°51′44″E	Ihavandhippolhu	
Maarandhoofarufinolhu	-	6°49′43″N 72°58′19″E	North Thiladhunmati	
Madulu	Agriculture	7°03′17″N 72°57′11″E	Ihavandhippolhu	Leased for long-term fisheries and agriculture.
Matheerah	-	7°01′39″N 72°49′08″E	Ihavandhippolhu	
Medhafushi	Agriculture	7°00′38″N 72°56′02″E	Ihavandhippolhu	Leased for long-term fisheries and agriculture.
Mulidhoo	-	6°50′10″N 73°00′40″E	North Thiladhunmati	
Naridhoo	Resort (Development)	6°53′42″N 73°07′36″E	North Thiladhunmati	
Umareifinolhu	-	7°00′34″N 72°51′03″E	Ihavandhippolhu	
Un'gulifinolhu	-	6°58′15″N 72°54′03″E	Ihavandhippolhu	
Van'gaaru	-	7°05′35″N 72°52′41″E	Ihavandhippolhu	
Velifinolhu	-	6°59′39″N 72°52′28″E	Ihavandhippolhu	

=== Disappeared Islands ===
These are islands which during recorded history, have been completely eroded away, claimed by the sea due to the sea-level rise associated with global warming or assimilated by other islands.

- Gasthirifinolhu
- Gudhanfushi
- Huraa
- Nasfaru
- Thiladhoo (merged into Dhidhdhoo, it was after this island that the atoll got its name of 'Thiladhunmathi')
- Thinadhoo

== Administration ==
=== Atoll Council ===
North Thiladhunmathi Atoll Council

Type
- Type: Atoll council

Leadership
- President: Moosa Shafeeq, MDP
- Seats: 14

Meeting place
- Secretariat of the North Thiladhunmathi Atoll Council, Shaariu’l Ameen, Dhidhdhoo

Website
- www.halifatoll.gov.mv

The North Thiladhunmathi Atoll administrative division is governed by an Atoll Council. The atoll council was created in 2011 with the enactment of the Decentralization Bill, which saw the introduction of local governance to the country. The secretariat of the atoll council is located on Dhidhdhoo.

The atoll is further divided up into 5 political wards each with one councillor.

=== Members ===
Ward	Code	Name	Elected	Party
Hoarafushi	A06	Mohamed Waheed	2021	MDP
Ihavandhoo	A07	Ahmed Sabah	2021	PPM
Baarah	A16	Safath Mohamed	2021	MDP
Dhidhdhoo	A10	Abdulla Rasheed	2021	PPM
Kelaa	A08	Abdulla Infaz	2021	PPM
Vashafaru	A09	Ahmed Mueen	2021	PPM
Utheem	A14	Abdulla Rasheed	2021	PPM
Thuraakunu	A01	Alee Abdulatheef	2021	PPM
Muraidhoo	A15	Alee Sinan	2021	MDP
Filladhoo	A11	Fathulla Hassan	2021	MDP
Thakandhoo	A13	Hussain Naeem	2021	MDP
Maarandhoo	A12	Jailam Haaroon	2021	PPM
Uligan	A02	Ahmed Muaaz Mohamed	2021	ID
Molhadhoo	A05	Mohamed Sinadh	2021	ID
