= Thiladhunmathi =

Largest atoll in the Maldives

Coordinates: 6.8037°N 73.0824°E

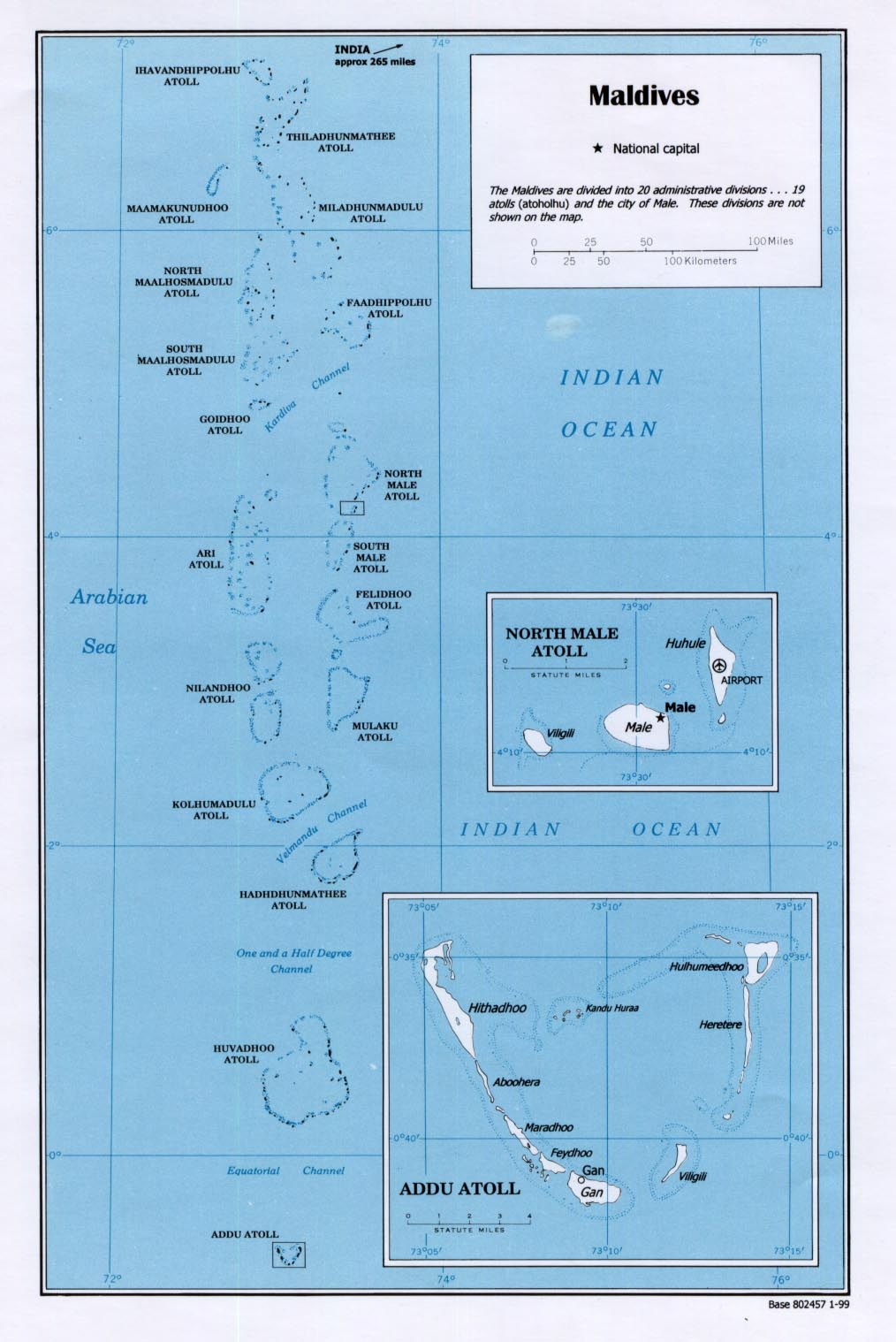
Map of the Maldives showing Thiladhunmathi Atoll in the north

Thiladhunmathi (also known as Boduthiladhunmathi) is the largest atoll in the Maldives, the Miladhunmadulu group is also naturally a part of Thiladhunmati Atoll, comprising the southern half of the atoll.

Administratively, Thiladhunmathi Atoll together with the Miladhunmadulu group consist of the administrative divisions of Haa Alif Atoll (North Thiladhunmathi), Haa Dhaalu Atoll (South Thiladhunmathi), Shaviyani Atoll (North Miladhunmadulu) and Noonu Atoll (South Miladhunmadulu).
