= Atolls of the Maldives =

Physical geographic entity

Coordinates: 4°10′30″N 73°30′32″E

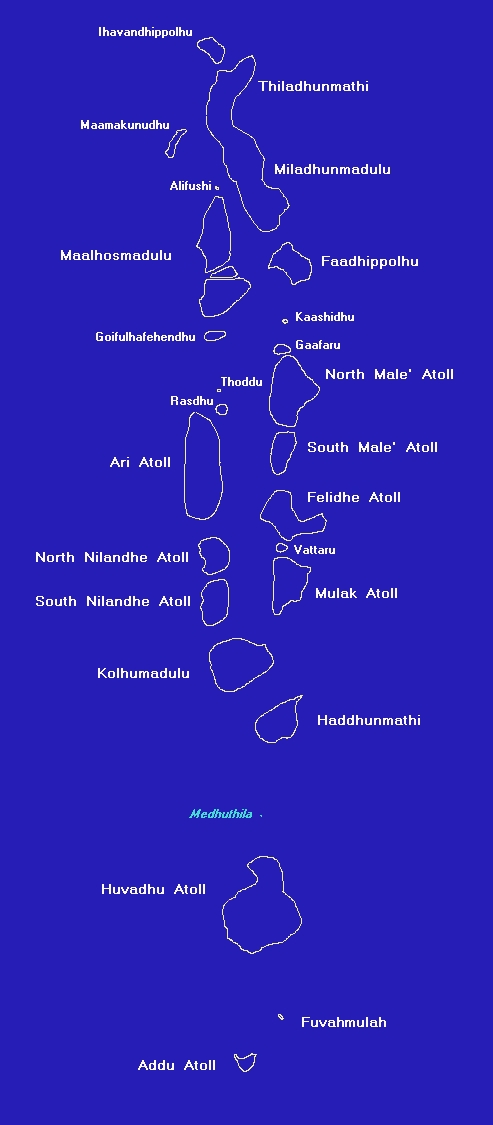
Geographic distribution of the Natural Atolls of the Maldives

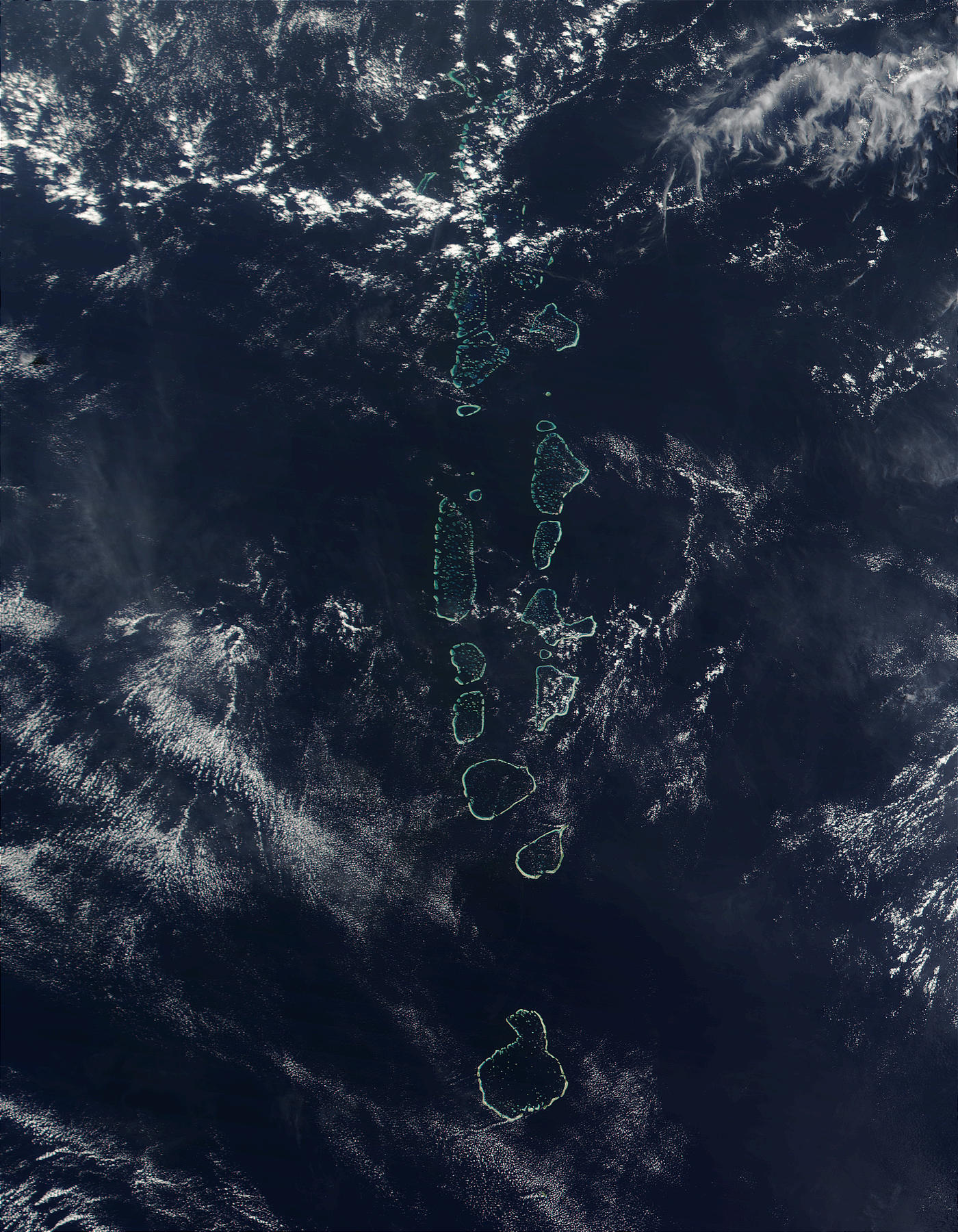
Satellite Image of the Maldives by NASA. The southernmost Atoll of the Maldives, Addu Atoll, is not visible on the image.

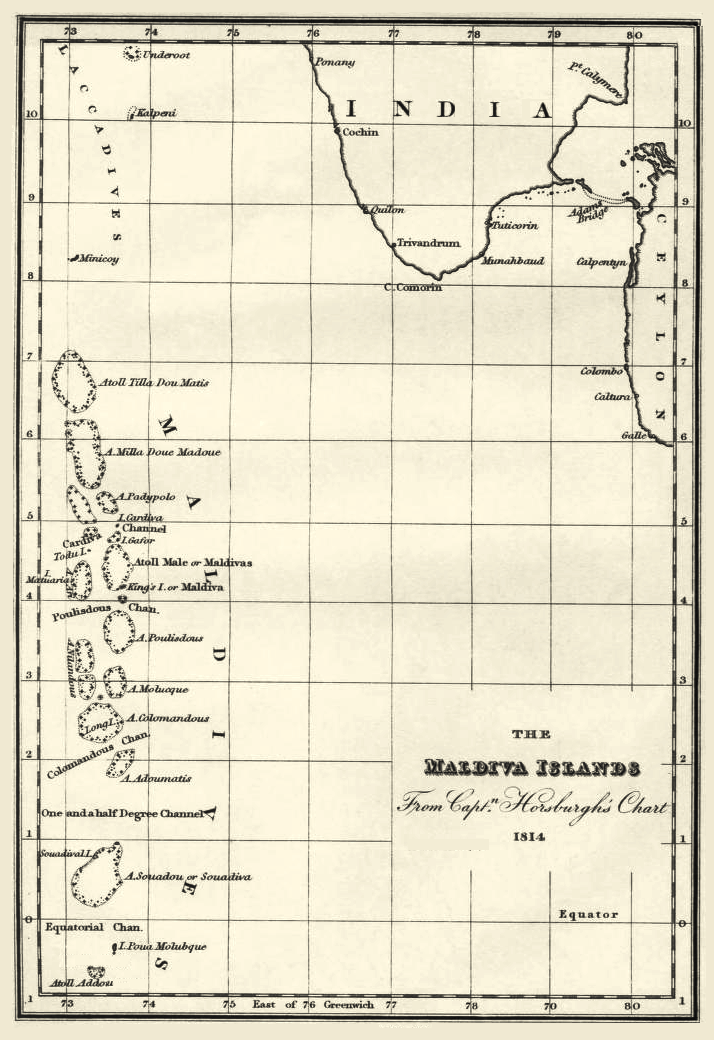
1814 map of 'The Maldiva Islands' by Captain James Horsburgh.

The Maldives consists of 20 natural atolls, along with a few islands and isolated reefs stretching from 7 degrees 10 minutes north to 0 degrees 45 minutes south. The largest of these atolls is Boduthiladhunmathi, while the atoll containing the most islands is Huvadhu.

Some atolls are in the form of a number of islands, and others in the form of isolated reefs, which could be classified as smaller atoll formations. All land above the surface in the Maldives is of coralline origin. The atolls of the Maldives form a quite regular chain and, especially in the northern and central atolls, an arrayed structure is apparent. There are broad and deep channels between some atolls. The origin of the word "atoll" itself is in the language of the Maldives. "Atoll" (from Dhivehi: atholhu) is now used in many languages worldwide.

The atolls of the Maldives are and were very dangerous for navigators due to their complexity. In 1834–1836, British captain Robert Moresby undertook the cartography of the Maldives, drawing the first accurate maritime charts of the atolls.

These Admiralty charts were printed as three separate large maps by the Hydrographic Service of the Royal Navy. Moresby's charts were also favoured by Maldivian pilots navigating through the treacherous waters of the atolls until the 1990s.

== Natural Atolls ==
There are 27 Natural Atolls:

1. Ihavandhippolhu, consider as part of Northern Thiladhunmathi Atoll
2. Thiladhunmathi Uthuruburi / Northern Thiladhunmathi Atoll / Boduthiladhunmathi Uthuruburi / Haa Alif
3. Thiladhunmathi Dhekunuburi / Southern Thiladhunmathi Atoll / Boduthiladhunmathi Dhekunuburi / Haa Dhaalu
4. Makunudhoo, consider as part of Southern Thiladhunmathi Atoll
5. Miladhunmadulu Uthuruburi / Northern Miladhunmadulu Atoll / Shaviyani
6. Miladhunmadulu Dhekunuburi / Southern Miladhunmadulu Atoll / Noonu
7. Maalhosmadulu Uthuruburi / Northern Maalhosmadulu Atoll / Raa
8. Maalhosmadulu Dhekunuburi / Southern Maalhosmadulu Atoll / Baa
9. Goifulhafehendhu Atoll / Goidhoo Atoll, consider as part of Baa Atoll
10. Faadhippolhu Atoll / Lhaviyani
11. Gaafaru Atoll (Gahaafaru Atoll), consider as part of North Malé Atoll
12. North Malé Atoll / Kaafu Uthuruburi
13. South Malé Atoll / Kaafu Dhekunuburi
14. Ari Atholhu Uthuruburi / Northern Ari Atoll / Alif Alif
15. Thoddoo Atoll, consider as part of Northern Ari Atoll
16. Rasdhoo Atoll, consider as part of Northern Ari Atoll
17. Ari Atholhu Dhekunuburi / Southern Ari Atoll / Alif Dhaal
18. Felidhu Atholhu / Vaavu
19. Mulaku Atholhu / Meemu
20. Nilandhe Atholhu Uthuruburi / Northern Nilandhe Atoll / Faafu
21. Nilandhe Atholhu Dhekunuburi / Southern Nilandhe Atoll / Dhaalu
22. Kolhumadulu Atoll / Thaa
23. Haddhunmathi Atoll / Laamu
24. Huvadhu Atholhu Uthuruburi / Northern Huvadhu Atoll / Gaafu Alif
25. Huvadhu Atholhu Dhekunuburi / Southern Huvadhu Atoll / Gaafu Dhaalu
26. Fuvahmulah / Gnaviyani
27. Addu Atoll / Seenu

There are 4 other minor atolls:

1. Etthingili Alifushi Atoll - near Raa Atoll (Northern Maalhosmadulu Atoll)
2. Fasdhuthere Atoll - between Raa Atoll (Northern Maalhosmadulu Atoll) and Baa Atoll (Southern Maalhosmadulu Atoll)
3. Vattaru Atoll - located near Felidhu Atoll (Vaavu Atoll). Consider as part of Felidhu Atoll (Vaavu Atoll)
4. Medhuthila Atoll - located between Haddhunmathi Atoll and Huvadhu Atoll

== Administrative Atolls ==
There are 21 Administrative Atolls (17 Atoll Councils and 4 Cities):

1. Thiladhunmathi Uthuruburi / Northern Thiladhunmathi Atoll / Haa Alif , HQ: Didhdhoo
2. Kulhudhuffushi City / Thiladhunmathi Dhekunuburi / Southern Thiladhunmathi Atoll / Haa Dhaalu [city] , HQ: Kulhudhuffushi
3. Miladhunmadulu Uthuruburi / Northern Miladhunmadulu Atoll / Shaviyani , HQ: Funadhoo
4. Miladhunmadulu Dhekunuburi / Southern Miladhunmadulu Atoll / Noonu , HQ: Manadhoo
5. Maalhosmadulu Uthuruburi / Northern Maalhosmadulu Atoll / Raa , HQ: U'ngoofaaru
6. Maalhosmadulu Dhekunuburi / Southern Maalhosmadulu Atoll / Baa / , HQ: Eydhafushi
7. Faadhippolhu Atoll / Lhaviyani , HQ: Naifaru
8. Kaafu / Malé Atholhu , HQ: Thulusdhoo
9. Malé City [city] , HQ: Malé City
10. Ari Atholhu Uthuruburi / Northern Ari Atoll / Alif Alif , HQ: Rasdhoo
11. Ari Atholhu Dhekunuburi / Southern Ari Atoll / Alif Dhaal , HQ: Mahibadhoo
12. Felidhu Atholhu / Vaavu , HQ: Felidhu
13. Mulaku Atholhu / Meemu , HQ: Muli
14. Nilandhe Atholhu Uthuruburi / Northern Nilandhe Atoll / Faafu , HQ: Nilandhoo
15. Nilandhe Atholhu Dhekunuburi / Southern Nilandhe Atoll / Dhaalu , HQ: Kudahuvadhoo
16. Kolhumadulu Atoll / Thaa , HQ: Veymandoo
17. Haddhunmathi Atoll / Laamu , HQ: Fonadhoo
18. Huvadhu Atholhu Uthuruburi / Northern Huvadhu Atoll / Gaafu Alif , HQ: Villingili
19. Huvadhu Atholhu Dhekunuburi / Southern Huvadhu Atoll / Gaafu Dhaalu , HQ: Thinadhoo
20. Fuvahmulah City / Gnaviyani [city] , HQ: Fuvahmulah City
21. Addu City / Seenu [city] , HQ: Hithadhoo

== Ihavandhippolhu ==
Ihavandhippolhu Atoll is the northernmost atoll in the Maldives. It is a small natural atoll 22 kilometres (14 miles) in length.

It has 25 islands lying all around the boundary reef. One long barrier reef forms the western side of the atoll. There are several coral patches in the lagoon and the general depth in the centre is 20 to 30 fathoms (35 to 55 m).

Ihavandhippolhu is bounded in the north by the broad channel known as Māmalē Kandu (or Maliku Kandu) which separates the islands of Maldives from those belonging to India.

Administratively, Ihavandhippolhu belongs to the North Thiladhunmathi (Haa Alifu) Atoll administrative division which also includes the northernmost portion of the Thiladhunmathi natural atoll.

== Thiladhunmathi ==
Boduthiladhunmathi Atoll is the largest of the Maldives atolls and the world's largest atoll (not taking into account the mostly submerged Great Chagos Bank and Saya de Malha Bank). It is very open, a typical atoll without a clearly delimited lagoon.

It is a huge atoll stretching SSW for 76 kilometres (47 miles) and contains nearly forty islands generally of a fair size. Kelaa, a large island forms a prominent point in the NE of this atoll.

The western boundary has fewer islands but more isolated reefs or micro-atolls (called faru in Maldivian), with wide passages between them. The German explorer Hans Hass observed the formation of this phenomenon called "micro-atoll" by Porites corals in the Maldives. Its lagoon has few shoals but many large faru, often topped with islands. The average depth is from 18 to 24 fathoms (33 to 44 m).

The Miladhunmadulu group is also naturally a part of Thiladhunmati Atoll, comprising the southern half of the atoll. The length of this part of the atoll is 81 kilometres (50 miles) and it contains 101 islands.

The general depth of the centre of this part is 20 to 25 fathoms (37 to 46 m) and the bottom is sandy. Along its western edges there are not many islands but more detached reefs with shallow lagoons (called vilu in Maldivian) which seldom exceed 10 fathoms (18 m) in depth.

Administratively, Thiladhunmathi Atoll together with the Miladhunmadulu group are divided among four administrative divisions, namely North Thiladhunmathi (Haa Alifu) Atoll, South Thiladhunmathi (Haa Dhaalu) Atoll, North Miladhunmadulu (Shaviyani) Atoll and South Miladhunmadulu (Noonu) Atoll.

== Maamakunudhoo ==
Māmakunudhoo Atoll or Makunudhoo is the westernmost atoll in the Maldives. A large reef with lagoon, 27 kilometres (17 miles) long with and average breadth of 5 kilometres (3.1 miles). It has only one inhabited island, Makunudhoo and three other islands (namely Innafushi, Fenboahuraa and Dhipparufushi) and it lies 15 kilometres (9.3 miles) west of the NW part of the Miladhummadulhu group. It is said to have been unknown to non-Maldivians previous to the 1834–36 survey of the Maldives. According to the locals, many ships have been lost on its barren reefs with crew, cargo and all. These include the Persia Merchant (August, 1658), Hayston (July, 1891), George Reid (September, 1872) and many more. Owing to the violence of the surf and the perpendicular sides of the reef scarcely a vestige of the wreck remains after a few hours. The lagoon is quite deep but it is full of coral patches.

== Etthingili Alifushi Atoll ==
Etthingili Alifushi Atoll consists of two islands, Alifushi and Etthingili (also known as Kalhifushi), known as 'The Powell Islands' in the Admiralty Chart. The islands stand on a detached reef of their own with very deep waters (no sounding) between this reef and the northern end of the main Atoll. The length of this atoll is 2 miles (3.2 kilometres) with a width of 1 mile (1.6 kilometres). Today, of the two islands, only Alifushi is inhabited.

== Maalhosmadulu Uthuruburi ==
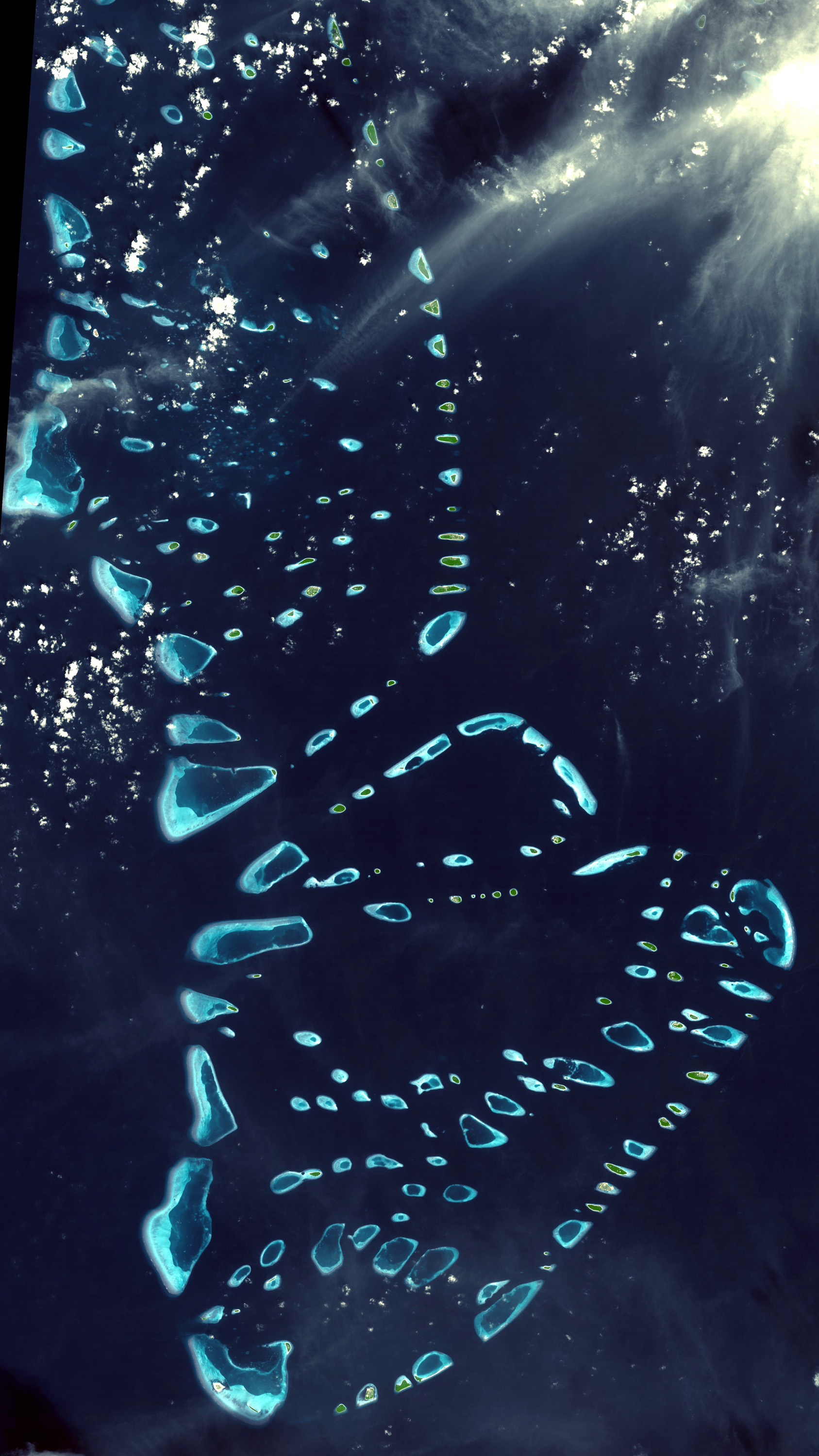
Malhosmadulhu Atoll seen from space. "Fasdutere" and Southern Malhosmadulhu can be seen very clearly in this picture

Maalhosmadulu Uthuruburi (Northern Maalhosmadulu Atoll) is 71 kilometres (44 miles) in length from N to S, and 26 kilometres (16 miles) across at its broadest part. Its western fringe is composed of a series of round or oval reefs (farus) irregularly placed (a feature peculiar to all the larger Northern Atolls). The centre is heavily dotted with coral patches (giri), some submerged and some awash. The concentration of giri is especially dense towards its SW quarter, close to Kandholhudhoo Island (where there is the place most crowded with small reefs and shoals in the whole Maldives), but its narrower northern end is quite clear of reefs. The general depths of the lagoon are from 23 to 27 fathoms (42 to 49 m).

== Fasdhooethere (Fasdhoothere) ==
Fasdhootherey Atoll is sandwiched between two atolls, the northern part of South Maalhosmadulu forms a clearly delimited, roughly triangular, natural atoll without a distinctive name (Fasdhootherey means 'between five islands'). It is 22 kilometres (14 miles) in length from east to west. It has 11 islands with the only inhabited island being Kudarikilu Island on its SE corner just opposite Landaa Giraavaru Island of Southern Maalhosmadulhu Atoll. Its lagoon becomes narrower towards the west and its average depth is 19 fathoms (35 m). It is separated from North Maalhosmadulhu by a deep channel (known as Moresby Channel in the Admiralty Chart and Hani Kandu locally) and from the southern part of Southern Maalhosmadulhu Atoll by the narrow Geydhoshu Kandu (also known as Ge'aa'badhigedheytherey Kandu) running from east to west.

== Maalhosmadulu Dhekunuburi ==
Maalhosmadulu Dhekunuburi (Southern Maalhosmadulu Atoll) has many large farus on its western side. Its maximum length is 48 kilometres (30 miles). The inner lagoons (vilu) present an idyllic view. The depth of their waters is not more than a few meters, with perhaps a few coral heads awash. Its eastern fringe is a succession of separate, quite regular, oval reefs with some islands. The interior of the lagoon has also large faru towards its southern half. The average depth is from 24 to 27 fathoms (44 to 49 m).

== Goidhu Atoll ==
Goidhu Atoll or Goifulhafehendhu Atoll is separated from South Maalhosmadulhu by a 10-kilometre-broad (6.2 mi) channel. This atoll is oval in shape and small, its greatest length being 15.5 kilometres (9.6 miles). It is composed of 7 islands, 3 of which are inhabited. The inner lagoon has a depth of 17 to 20 fathoms (31 to 37 m); it has a sandy bottom mixed with mud and clay. Unlike the lagoons of most small atolls of the Maldives, this lagoon is free from coral heads in its centre.

== Faadhippolhu ==
Faadhippolhu Atoll (better known as Lhaviyani Atoll) is a smaller atoll with a well-defined barrier reef to the east, on which the NE monsoon (iruvai) breaks with violence. Its western side has farus and reef patches. There are about 52 islands, of which only 5 are inhabited. The lagoon is fairly open and its general depths are from 25 to 30 fathoms (about 50 m). Its bottom is sandy and there are a number of coral patches and sunken reefs dotting it, except for the south-eastern side.

== Kaashidhu Atoll ==
Kaashidhu Atoll, lies towards the eastern end of the channel to which it gives its name . This atoll had two islands namely Kaashidhoo and Kaashidhoo Huraa from which only Kaashidhoo exists today. Kaashidhoo is surrounded by deep waters and there is generally heavy surf all around. The Atoll has an oval-shaped lagoon (vilu) with a narrow fringing reef on its NW side.

== Gahaafaru (Gaafaru) Atoll ==
Gahaafaru Atoll also known as Gaafaru Atoll or Gaafarufalhu is a small atoll at the eastern end of a large elliptical reef that has proved disastrous to many vessels with the wrecks of Aracan (1873), SS Seagull (1879), Clan Alpine (1879), Erlangen (1894), Crusader (1905) and Lady Cristine (1974). 15 kilometres (9.3 miles) long and 8.5 kilometres (5.3 miles) wide Gaafaru reef is as much a separate atoll as Goidu or Rasdhu which are similar in structure and size. It is separated from Malé Atoll by a narrow but deep Gaafaru Kandu channel. Its lagoon has an average depth of 16 fathoms and has no coral patches or shoals in its centre.

== Male'atholhu Uthuruburi ==
Male'atholhu Uthuruburi also known as North Malé Atoll is of irregular shape. It is 58 kilometres (36 miles) long and contains about 50 islands (including the capital Malé). There are also sandbanks, coral patches, innumerable farus and submerged shoals (called "haa" in Dhivehi). The general depths of the interior are between 25 and 35 fathoms (46 to 64 m). The bottom is sandy. There are numerous passages on all sides. Seen from space it is considered one of the most beautiful atolls on the planet.

== Male'atholhu Dhekunuburi ==
Male'atholhu Dhekunuburi also known as South Malé Atoll is separated from North Malé Atoll by a deep channel (Vaadhu Kandu). Oblong in shape, this atoll is 35 kilometres (22 miles) in length. It contains 22 islands, all except for 5 are situated in its eastern fringes. Inside this atoll there are also many reefs and little coral patches which make navigation difficult. The general depths of the lagoon are from 25 to 32 fathoms (46 to 59 m), sandy bottom. South of the atoll lies the deep Fulidhoo Kandu.

== Thoddu Atoll ==
Thoddu Atoll is a solitary round-shaped atoll located in deep waters at the western entrance of the Kardiva Channel. Its reef is steep and it lacks a lagoon.

== Rasdhu Atoll ==
Rasdhu Atoll also known as Rasdhukuramathi Atoll ('Ross Atoll' in the Admiralty Chart) is a small atoll with an almost round lagoon. It is located almost 8 kilometres (5.0 miles) from the NE point of Ari Atoll. The northern and western sides are one continuous barrier reef, and the eastern side is another. The 7-kilometre-wide (4.3 mi) lagoon has soundings from 15 to 20 fathoms (27 to 37 m) and abounds in detached coral patches.

== Ari Atoll ==
Ari Atoll is the second westernmost atoll of the Maldives, only after Maamakunudhoo Atoll. It is oblong in shape, 89 kilometres (55 miles) in length by only 31 kilometres (19 miles) in breadth. It contains some 50 islands, generally small, which lie mainly along its eastern fringe. Its features are intermediate between Maalhosmadulhu and North Malé atolls. Except for a small barrier reef in its southern end, it is shaped by a succession of large, separate oval reefs, like the large atolls in the North, with a clear rim of large faru to the east. In the interior the general soundings are 30 to 40 fathoms (55 to 73 m), with mud and sand. In places its lagoon contains small reef-patches, but it is generally dotted with many large coral reefs, some of which remain submerged even at low tide.

== Felidhe Atoll ==
Felidhe Atoll has a very irregular outline; it is surrounded by continuous barrier reefs, or by small patches with vilu separated by narrow passages. Felidhu Atoll has only 10 islands even though it is quite large. The Atoll's western "horn" is devo westernmost point of this atoll (Fussaru) are dangerous for local navigation. Many ships plying along the route between Malé and the Southern Atolls, have been lost in these treacherous reefs. The distance between both points is 57 kilometres (35 miles). The inner lagoon is open with few reefs or shoals. Its general depth is of 40 fathoms (73 m); hard bottom of sand. The Atoll is also home the eastern most island and point of the Maldives.

== Vattaru Atoll (Falhu) ==
Vattaru Atoll (Falhu) is an egg-shaped reef or small atoll about 8.5 kilometres (5.3 miles) in length. It has only one small uninhabited bushy islet close to its only entrance in the south. The depth of its inner lagoon is between 12 and 20 fathoms (22 to 37 m) and its bottom is sandy.

== Mulaku Atoll ==
Mulaku Atoll is a very shut-in atoll with an open lagoon surrounded by barrier reefs which are remarkably straight and broad in its western fringe. It is separated from the other Maldive atolls by the channels Vattaru Kandu in the north, Kudahuvadhoo Kandu in the south and the Hatharu-Atholhu Medu Kandu in the west. Mulaku Atoll is 48 kilometres (30 miles) long and contains 21 islands, which lie mostly on its SE quarter. The shoals inside the lagoon are generally smaller than in the Northern atolls. There are many coral patches and the depth of the water varies from 28 to 40 fathoms (51 to 73 m); sandy bottom.

== Nilandhe Atholhu Uthuruburi ==
Nilandhe Atholhu Uthuruburi (Northern Nilandhe Atoll) is 29 kilometres (18 miles) long. It forms a perfect semicircle on the east, but its western side is rather indented. There are not many islands on its fringes. In the interior of its lagoon there are four islands and several large farus, dry at low tide. The average depth of its lagoon is 25 to 35 fathoms (55 to 64 m). The atoll is separated from Ari Atoll by the channel known as Ariadhoo Kandu.

== Nilandhe Atholhu Dhekunuburi ==
Nilandhe Atholhu Dhekunuburi (Southern Nilandhe Atoll) is separated from Northern Nilandhe Atoll by a 6-kilometre-wide (3.7 mi) channel. It is larger than its northern neighbor, with a length of 38 kilometres (24 miles). It is separated from its northern sister atoll by the narrow channel called the Dheburudheetheree Kandu. Its shape is slightly oval, with some barrier reefs that are quite straight in the eastern fringe. There are 21 islands, but only two or three are on its western side. The lagoon is comparatively open, with few, but relatively greater farus as well as a few small coral patches or shoals (giri); average depth 27 to 35 fathoms (49 to 64 m), muddy bottom.

== Kolhumadulu ==
The eastern and western rows of atolls that form Central Maldives end in Kolhumadulu Atoll south of the channel Kudahuvadhoo Kandu. It is mostly rimmed by barrier reefs which are topped by islands or deep pools (vilu). There are many islands along its southern boundary. Owing to its typical atoll shape, it differs in no respect from atolls in the Pacific Ocean, save for its greater size. The length of Kolhumadulhu Atoll is 51 kilometres (32 miles). The lagoon is comparatively open, although it is studded with numerous small coral patches or shoals which are awash at low tide. The general depth is from 32 to 42 fathoms (59 to 77 m) and it is mud-bottomed at the centre. South of the atoll lies the deep Veymandoo Kandu channel which separates it from the Hadhdhunmathee Atoll.

== Haddhunmathi ==
Haddhunmathi Atoll is regular in shape and 48 kilometres (30 miles) in length. Excepting for the projection of the reef at its NE corner (Isdhū Muli), it closely resembles Kolhumadulhu. Its reefs are generally of little breadth, with no signs of vilu, except for its eastern fringes which are covered with islands that are quite large by Maldive standards. The lagoon is comparatively open, containing scattered shoal patches and no emerged islands; the bottom is muddy and the average depth is from 30 to 34 fathoms (55 to 62 m).

== Medhuthila Atoll ==
Medhuthila atoll is speculated to be a newly forming atoll of the Maldives between Haddhunmathi and Huvadhoo Atoll. There is currently not much research done about the atoll.

== Huvadhoo Atoll ==
Huvadhoo Atoll measures 79 kilometres (49 miles) from north to south, embracing an area of about 2,900 square km. Huvadhu Atoll is fringed by a well-defined and almost continuous rim-reef. The exterior islands, formed in general of coral boulders on their seaward side (futtaru) and sand on the reef's inner face (etherevaru), are string along the east, south and SW sides of the atoll. There are over 230 islands with 30 sandy islands in the centre of its lagoon, more than any other atoll of the Maldives. The 32-kilometre (20 mi) stretch between the channels of Kaadedhoo Kandu and Fiyoaree Kandu alone has 77 islands, only 5 being inhabited and many unnamed. The atoll's lagoon is open and very free from reef patches, although some precipitous shoals approach the surface. The lagoon bottom is covered with sand and has a maximum depth of 50 fathoms (91 m), being on average deeper than any other lagoon of the Maldive Atolls. It is a relatively isolated atoll with the 97-kilometre-wide (60 mi) Huvadhoo Kandu (Suvadiva Channel) to the north and the 49-kilometre-wide (30 mi) Addoo Kandu (South Equatorial Channel) to the south. This is the worlds 3rd largest atoll. Geographically from the number of islands and from the area this atoll is known as the world biggest atoll.

=== Guinness World Record ===
Huvadhu Atoll, located in the Maldives within the Indian Ocean, spans approximately 2,900 square kilometers (1,100 square miles) and encompasses around 255 islands within its confines. It holds the Guinness World Record for the atoll with the most number of islands in the World.

== Fuvahmulah ==
Fuvahmulah is a large single island (by itself a small detached atoll) which lies in the Equatorial Channel. In the distant past Fuvahmulah was a small coral atoll whose southern end was open at a spot called Diyarehifaando and the inside of the island was a saltwater lagoon forming a natural harbour. There is a spot in the southern end known as a Kudhuheraivali (the forest of the small islet), which indicates that there was a separate little island in that area in ancient times. But long ago the channel connecting the lagoon with the ocean was closed by massive coral boulders. Thus the inside of the island is lower than its edges. In time the inner lagoon lost its saltiness and all that remains today are two small lakes, wetlands and marshy taro fields. Therefore, Fuvahmulah is a small Atoll that closed and filled in with silt, like Nukutavake in the Central Pacific.

== Addu Atoll ==
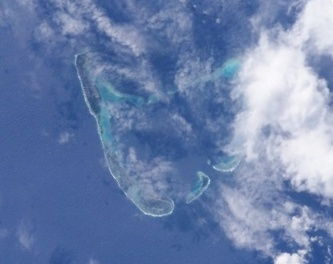
Addu Atoll seen from space. Note the continuous reef fringing Addu from the west and southwest.

Addu Atoll marks the southern end of the Maldive archipelago. Addu Atoll is 21 kilometres (13 miles) long and it is fringed by broad barrier reefs with large islands on its eastern and western sides. Its lagoon has no islands and is relatively open with few shoals in its centre, but having mazes of coral patches close to the NW and NE corners of its encircling reefs in 7 to 10 fathoms (13 to 18 m) of water. The general depths vary from 20 to 25 fathoms (37 to 46 m), with mud and sand at the bottom.

The distance from Addu Atoll to the closest island in the Chagos Archipelago (Île Yeye, Peros Banhos Atoll) is about 520 kilometres (320 miles), with nothing but deep ocean in between them.

Note: Further south Haddhummati in the middle of the vast emptiness of the Huvadu Channel there is a small bank known as Medutila (also called Derahaa). This place is the peak of a submarine mountain, and perhaps an atoll in the process of formation. This bank is very difficult to spot for at its shallowest point there is a depth of 6 fathoms (11 m).

== Etymology of atoll names ==
The names of the natural atolls of the Maldives are the names given to them by the first settlers of the country or the names derived from these. The atolls are usually named after islands that belong to the atoll and perhaps those that were the first sites of settlements in each atoll, or the main island of each atoll. The etymology of the names of the atolls can be traced as follows.

- Ihavandhippolhu Atoll - after the island of Ihavandhoo in the south east of the atoll.
- Thiladhunmati - after the island of Thiladhoo (now part of Dhiddhoo island).
- Māmakunudhoo - the major (mā) division to which the island of Makunudhoo belong to.
- Miladummadulu - after the island of Milandhoo on the eastern fringes of the atoll.
- Faadhippolhu - after Faadhoo island. Traditionally the name was Faadu Bur (that is, a complete circle from Fadhoo back to Faadhoo).
- Alifushi-Ethingili Atoll - after the islands of Alifushi and Ethingili, the only two islands in the atoll.
- The Maalhosmadulu Atolls - after the island of Maalhos, now in the southern atoll.
- Fasdhūtherē Atoll - literally means ‘what lies between the five islands’.
- Goifulhafehendhu Atoll - amalgamation of the names of the three inhabited islands of the atoll, Goidhoo, Fulhadhoo and Fehendhoo.
- The Male’ Atolls - after the island of Male’, the capital of the Maldives since 1117. It was previously called "Biadhoo Atholhu" named after the island of Biyadhoo in the southern atoll.
- Thoddoo Atoll - After Thoddoo island, the only island in the reef.
- Rasdhukuramathi Atoll - amalgamation of the names of the two largest islands of the atoll, Rasdhoo and Kuramathi.
- Ari Atoll - after Ariadhoo island, an important historic religious centre of the Maldives in the pre-Islamic era.
- Felidhu Atoll - after the island of Felidhoo, the capital of the atoll.
- Vattaru Atoll - Named after the only island in the reef, Vattaru, now in Vaavu Atoll. Also known as "Falhu Atholhu" Meaning "Uninhabited Atoll", as it is the only atoll in The Maldives without an Inhabited Island,
- Mulaku Atoll - after the island of Boli Mulah, an important historic centre of the Maldives.
- The Nilandhe Atolls - after the island of Nilandhoo, now in the northern atoll and was an important historic religious centre of the Maldives in the pre-Islamic era.
- Kolhumadulu - meaning atoll at the end (kolhu) in reference to the end of the east–west divide of the Maldives Atolls between Kaashidhoo Kandu and Kudahuvadhoo Kandu.
- Haddhunmathi - from Ihadhunmathi meaning the first seen (iha'dhuh) part (mathi) or after the island of Ihadhoo (first island) that was located east of Isdhoo; this is believed to be the first region of the archipelago that was settled by the ancient Dheyvis people.
- Huvadhu Atoll - after the island of Keyhuvadhoo which was located between Hoandedhoo and the island of Hunigondiréhaa (few remains of the settlement such as coral wells can be seen on what is now a reef). The name Huvadhu itself means ‘the forbidden place’.
- Fuvahmulah - Areca nut (Fuvah in the local language) is a major product of this atoll or island in vast quantities from ancient times. The original name of the island could have simply been Mulah, but was called Fuvahmulah (the Mulah (island) of the arecanut palms) to distinguish it from Boli Mulah - another important island in ancient Maldives.
- Addu Atoll - after the island of Addu which was located south of Gan. The island of Addu was dredged off by the British in 1959 to construct the Gan airfield.

The few atoll names on the Admitralty charts that differ from their local Dhivehi names (namely Malcolm Atoll, Horsburg Atoll and Ross Atoll) were named by Robert Moresby in honor of famous commanders and officers of the British Empire, after the Moresby Cartographic Survey (1834–1836) of the Maldive Islands.

== Channels ==
There are broad channels between the atolls known locally as kandu. These were important for ancient mariners plying along the spice route trying to bypass the long atoll chains without harm. The most important ones were the Maliku Kandu, the Kardiva Channel and the Suvadiva Channel.

There are other types of channel in the atolls. One is the channel into the atoll's lagoon and the other is the passage on top of the reef into the vilu. These are very important for Maldivian sailors.

== Island environment ==
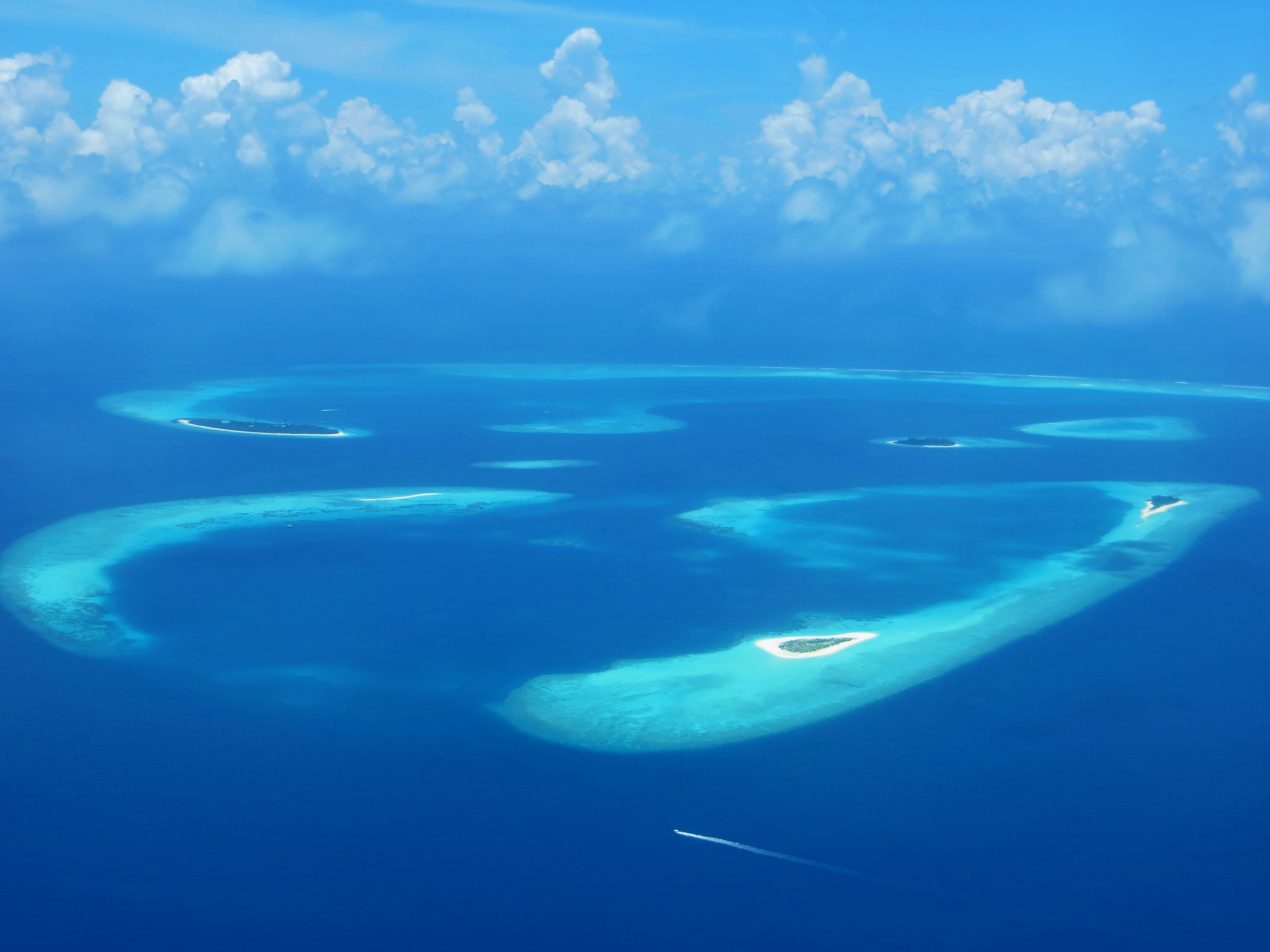
Sky view of a part of Baa Atoll.

The islands in the atolls of the Maldives rest on the shelf provided by the reefs. Many reefs have no islands at all, but all islands in the Maldives have an underlying coralline reef. Usually islands are flat and sandy. Often there is a rocky bottom made up of a coral rock conglomerate underneath the island proper. Some islands are long and sandy while others have a rounder shape. The round islands often are lower in the centre, sometimes having a muddy or marshy spot.

Islands may disappear when the currents on the reef change. New islands also may appear, beginning as sandbanks or coral gravel heaps at another location of the reef. Therefore, in the Maldives, islands are constantly eroding and constantly being formed. Human action, in the form of jetties or the dredging of channels on the reef, may change the pattern of currents on the reef and accelerate erosion.

The atolls in Maldives are often separated from each other by vast expanses of the deepest ocean; but despite the great distances, the daily life of Maldivians in the individual inhabited islands shows very few differences all along the length of the atoll chain.

== Neighbouring island groups ==
The atolls are part of the long submerged mountain range that extends from the Laccadives, or Lakshadweep, in the north, to the Chagos in the south. Northern Maldivians used to often visit Maliku, Minicoy Island, before the 1960s when it was allowed for them to do so. But even Northern Maldivians knew little about the Laccadive islands further north.

The Laccadives are different in structure from the Maldives. The most conspicuous fact is the absence of large atolls and the low density of reef and island structures. Most reefs have only one island on them.

In the south of Maldives the Chagos Archipelago is known as Hollhavai (Foalhavahi in Dhivehi). But even in these remote and strongly oceanic Southern Maldive atolls, knowledge about their neighboring island group is only vague and fragmentary. The Chagos group is a combination of different coralline structures. Unlike in the Maldives there is not a clearly discernible pattern of arrayed atolls.

However, one of the atolls of the Chagos, Peros Banhos, is very similar in structure to the typical Maldive atoll. Although it is rather small by Maldive standards, it is the largest emerged atoll in the Chagos. Peros Banhos is approximately as large as Northern Nilandhe Atoll.

== Historic nomenclature ==
The earliest mention of all the names of the atolls of the Maldives is in describing the Deeva Mahal Kingdom of King Koimala Siri Mahaabarana around 1117 A.D. He was the first king to rule over the whole of Maldives. His kingdom was referred to as being Malikaddu dhemedhu- or 'all that lies between the Maliku and Addu. He fought against the Raja Dada Indians to claim the two northernmost atolls for the newly formed Maldivian kingdom. All 14 atolls of his kingdom from the north to south were then named as follows:

- Malikatholhu (now Minicoy island belonging to India)
- Thiladunmathi (Northern and southern parts of Thiladhunmathi Atoll)
- Miladunmaduva (Northern and southern parts of Miladhunmadulhu Atoll)
- Maalhosmaduva (North and South Maalhosmadulhu Atolls)
- Faadu Bur (Faadhippolhu)
- Mahal Atholhu (The Male' Atolls)
- Ari-adhe Atholhu (Ari Atoll)
- Felide Atholhu (Felide Atoll)
- Mulakatholhu (Mulaku Atoll)
- Nilande Atholhu (North and South Nilande Atolls)
- Kolhumaduva (Kolhumadulu)
- Ihadhunmathi (Haddhunmathi Atoll)
- Suvadinmathi (Huvadhu Atoll)
- Addumulah (Addu and Fuvahmulah Atolls)

== Recent divisions ==
For administrative purposes, the country has been divided into twenty administrative atolls and five cities.

In 2009 the 20 administrative divisions (that is, excluding Male') were grouped under seven provinces, with each province comprising two or more natural atolls (with the exception of the Medhu-Dhekunu Province made up of solely Huvadhu Atoll). The seven new provinces correspond to the historic divisions of Uthuru Boduthiladhunmathi. Dhekunu Boduthiladhunmathi, Uthuru Medhu-Raajje, Medhu-Raajje, Dhekunu Medhu-Raajje, Huvadhu (or Uthuru Suvadinmathi) and Addumulakatholhu (or Dhekunu Suvadinmathi).
