= Telephone numbers in the Maldives =

Telephone numbers in Maldives
- Country: Maldives
- Continent: Asia
- NSN length: 7
- Country code: +960
- International access: 00
- Long-distance: none

Telephone numbers in the Maldives use the country calling code +960 and the international call prefix 00; there is no domestic trunk prefix. The current numbering plan was introduced in 2005 and ordinary telephone numbers have seven-digit national significant numbers. Fixed-line numbers are geographically allocated, with ranges beginning with 3 used in Malé City and ranges beginning with 6 used in Addu City and the atolls. Mobile number ranges beginning with 7 are allocated to Dhiraagu, while ranges beginning with 9 are allocated to Ooredoo. The numbering plan also includes separate allocations for paging and premium-rate services.

== Numbering in the Maldives ==
National Significant Numbers (NSN): seven digits

Format: +960 xxx xxxx

The current numbering plan was introduced in 2005.

== Fixed Telephony ==
List of area codes
Location	Previous numbers	New numbers
Malé City
Malé		3 01 XXXX
Malé		3 30 XXXX
Malé	31 XXXX	3 31 XXXX
Malé	32 XXXX	3 32 XXXX
Malé	33 XXXX	3 33 XXXX
Malé	34 XXXX	3 34 XXXX
Hulumalé	35 XXXX	3 35 XXXX
Villingili	39 XXXX	3 39 XXXX
Addu City
Seenu	57 XXXX; 58 XXXX	6 88 XXXX; 6 89 XXXX; 6 90 XXXX
Atolls
Haa Alif	20 XXXX	6 50 XXXX
Haa Dhaalu	21 XXXX	6 52 XXXX
Shaviyani	22 XXXX	6 54 XXXX
Noonu	22 XXXX	6 56 XXXX
Raa	22 XXXX	6 58 XXXX
Baa	23 XXXX	6 60 XXXX
Lhaviyani	23 XXXX	6 62 XXXX
Kaafu	44 XXXX	6 64 XXXX
Alif Alif	45 XXXX	6 66 XXXX
Alif Dhaalu	45 XXXX	6 68 XXXX
Vaavu	45 XXXX	6 70 XXXX
Meemu	46 XXXX	6 72 XXXX
Faafu	46 XXXX	6 74 XXXX
Dhaalu	46 XXXX	6 76 XXXX
Thaa	47 XXXX	6 78 XXXX
Laamu	47 XXXX	6 80 XXXX
Gaafu Alifu	51 XXXX	6 82 XXXX
Gaafu Dhaalu	52 XXXX	6 84 XXXX
Gnaviyani	54 XXXX	6 86 XXXX

== Mobile Telephony ==
LIST OF ALLOCATIONS
Existing number format	New number format
7 XXXXX (Dhiraagu); 8 XXXXX (Dhiraagu)	7 7XXXXX (Dhiraagu); 7 8XXXXX (Dhiraagu); 7 6XXXXX (Dhiraagu); 7 9XXXXX (Dhiraagu); 7 3XXXXX (Dhiraagu – new allocation)
	9 1XXXXX (Ooredoo); 9 2XXXXX (Ooredoo); 9 6XXXXX (Ooredoo); 9 7XXXXX (Ooredoo); 9 8XXXXX (Ooredoo); 9 9XXXXX (Ooredoo)

== Paging ==
LIST OF ALLOCATIONS
Existing number format	New number format
81 XXXX	781 99515

== Premium Rate Services ==
LIST OF ALLOCATIONS
New Allocation	Effective Date
+960 900 XXX XXXX	September 2010
