= Depopulation of Havaru Thinadhoo =

1962 forced removal of entire population from the island

The depopulation of Havaru Thinadhoo occurred in 1962, following the formation of the United Suvadive Republic. Thinadhoo, the wealthiest island at the time, was forcibly depopulated and destroyed. Before this event, which has been described as ethnic cleansing, the island had a population of over 6,000. It is estimated that as many as 4,000 residents either perished from starvation or were killed.

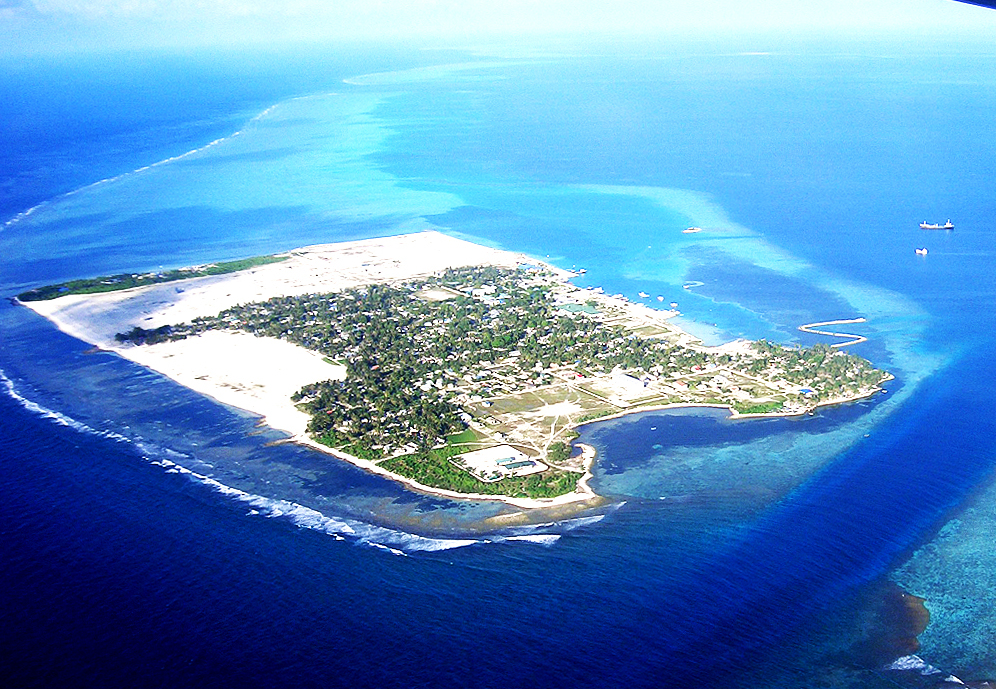
Havaru Thinadhoo in 2006.

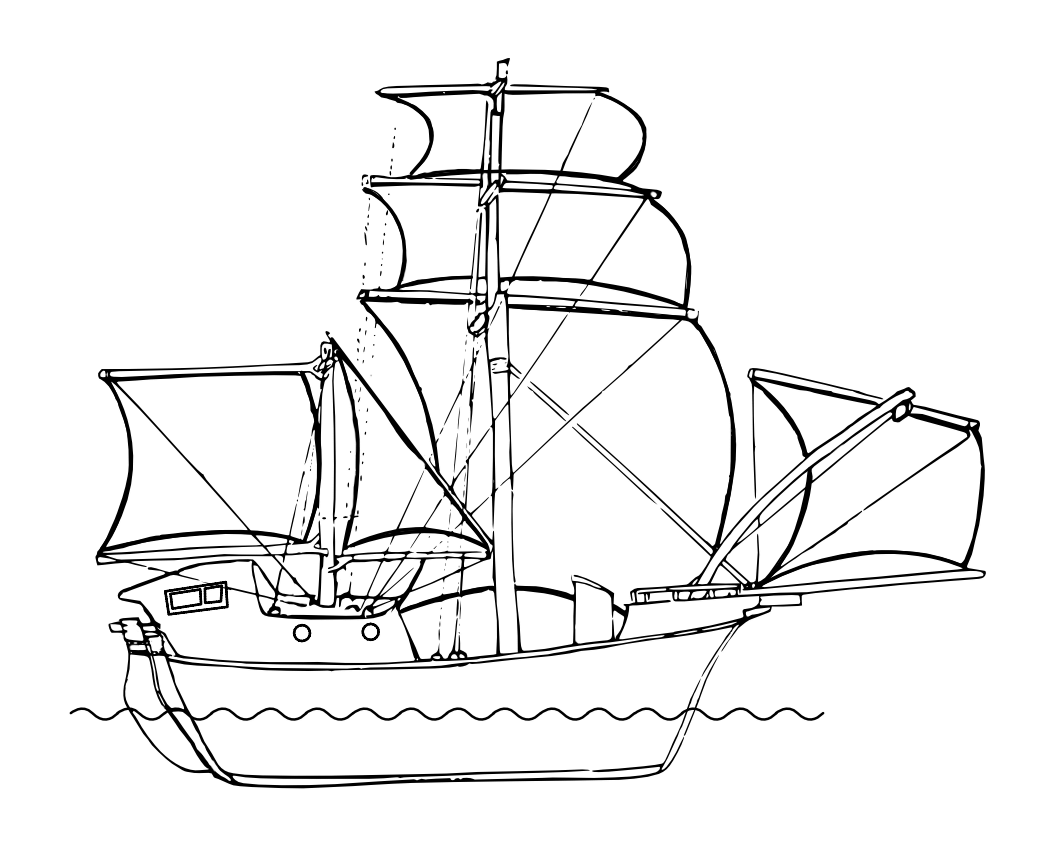
Long distance 100 to 200 dead-weight tonnage Odi (Ship) of Huvadu design type from the Southern Atolls. The Odis were built in the Southern Atolls and were operational until the 1960s. Havaru Thinadhoo had 40 Odis before they were discontinued and were famous throughout the Indian Ocean. Fully decked with deck-houses and a large overhanging forecastle. Three-mast arrangement at the rig. A large mainsail set atop a tall mainmast. Fore-and-aft gaff-sail set from the mizzen. Raking foremast carrying a square foresail well out over the bows.

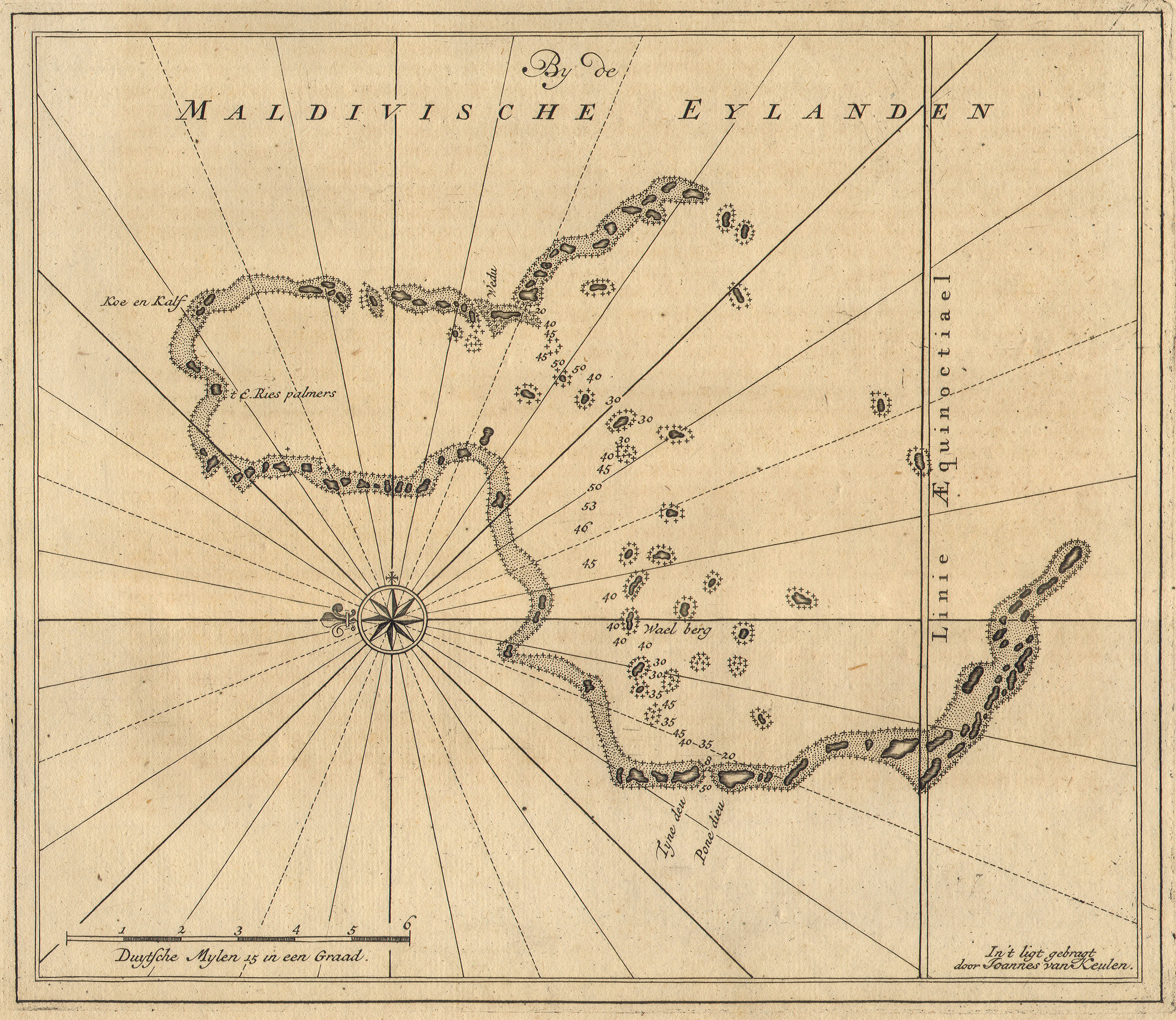
1753 Van Keulen Dutch map of Huvadu atoll. Havaru Thinadhoo is stated as "Tyne Dew," which is a more accurate pronunciation of the island in the Huvadhoo dialect. Thinadhoo is how it is pronounced in the Male dialect.

== Background ==
Havaru Thinadhoo once operated nine long-haul ships, with Gadhdhoo operating two ships, Nilandhoo operating three ships, and Dhaandhoo operating two ships, bringing the total to 16 ships in Huvadhu. The island was renowned for its frequent voyages, and its wealth enabled the southern atolls of the Maldives to form a nascent thalassocracy.

=== First rebellion ===
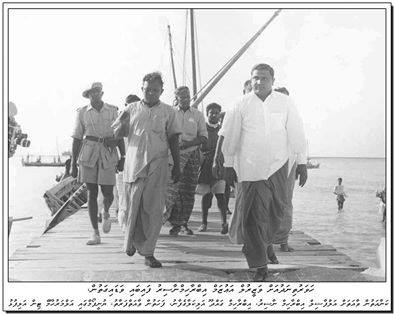
July 1959, Prime Minister Ibrahim Nasir of Maldives arriving to Huvadhoo Atoll Thinadhoo to quell first rebellion. From left: Prime Minister Ibrahim Nasir, Ibrahim Gadhdhoo Ali Kaleygefaan. From right: Tinu Alifulhu (Soldier in uniform).

In July 1959, the southernmost atolls, consisting of Huvadhu Atoll, Addu Atoll, and Fuvahmulah, which had benefited economically from the British presence, severed ties with the Maldivian government and formed an independent state, the United Suvadive Republic, with Abdullah Afeef as president and Hithadhoo as its capital. This secession followed Prime Minister Ibrahim Nasir's intention to close RAF Gan and expel the British.

Prime Minister Ibrahim Nasir, accompanied by army personnel, traveled to Thinadhoo on a gunboat and attacked the residents, arresting the alleged leaders of the United Suvadive Republic present at the time.

The United Kingdom expressed disapproval of the Maldivian government due to the violent attack on the residents of Huvadhu on 7 August 1959.

=== Partitioning of Huvadu Atoll ===
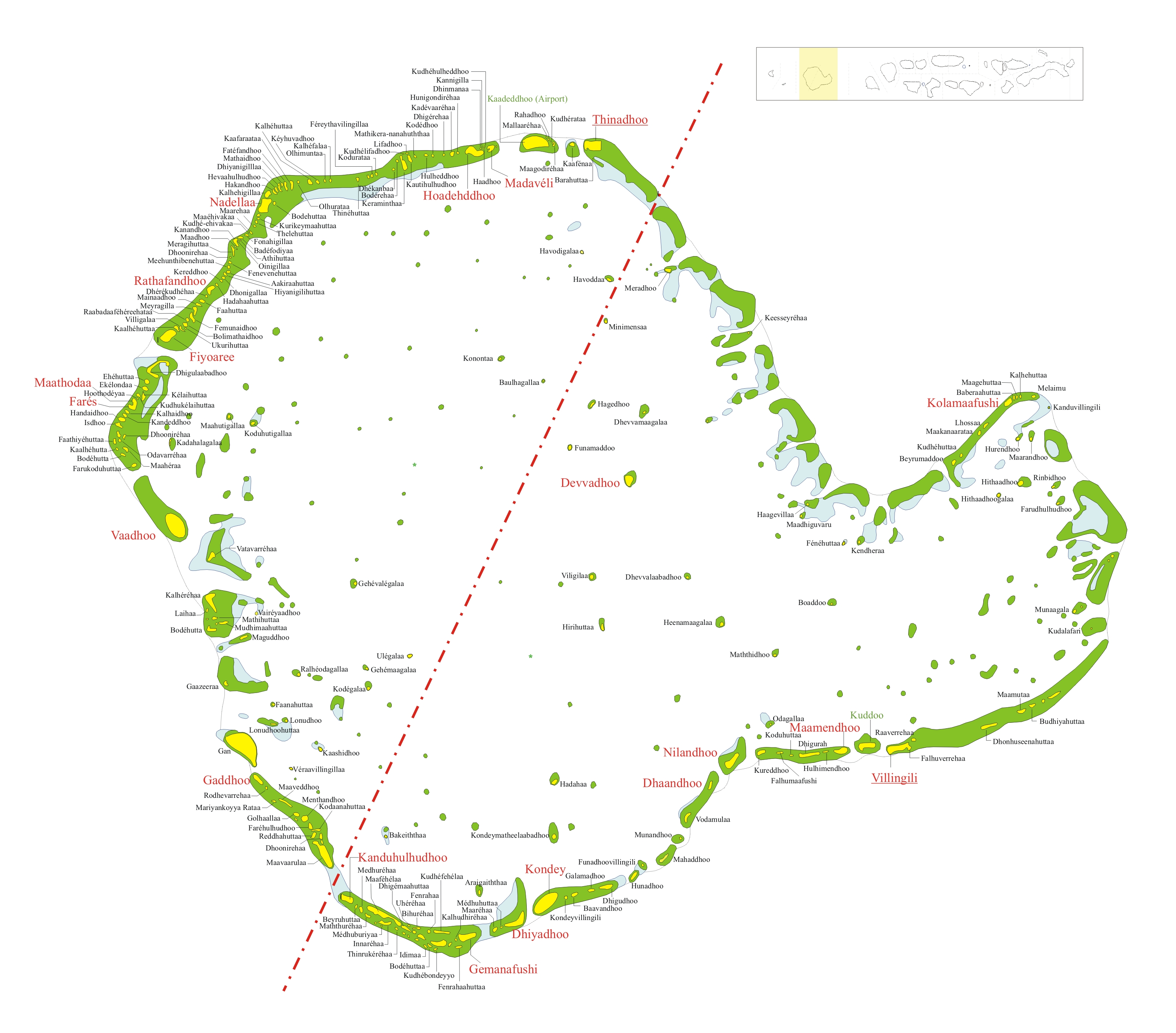
Huvadhoo Atoll is partitioned into two administrative regions, Gaafu Alif and Gaafu Dhaalu.

After the first rebellion, Huvadhu Atoll was partitioned into two administrative regions, Huvadu East and Huvadu West, which were later renamed Huvadu South and Huvadu North. Today, these regions are known as Gaafu Alifu Atoll and Gaafu Dhaalu Atoll.

== Second rebellion ==
All available photos and videos related to the events involving the Maldives Prime Minister Ibrahim Nasir and Thinadhoo are associated with the first uprising. No public media has been released regarding the second uprising. However, it is alleged that Prime Minister Ibrahim Nasir had access to videos and images captured during the event.

The second rebellion was triggered by several laws enacted in the Maldives that significantly impacted the merchants of Havaru Thinadhoo. These laws included increased tariffs and a new payment mechanism that required all payments for sold items to pass through the Maldivian government, resulting in prolonged delays for merchants in Havaru Thinadhoo. This restructuring severely hindered the island's thriving economy.

Another contributing factor was the abusive behavior of Maldivian government soldiers stationed in Havaru Thinadhoo. Despite repeated appeals to the Maldivian government to improve conditions on the island, no response was received. Karankaa Rasheed, a staff member of the Maldives' People's Majlis (parliament), later claimed that no such letter was ever received and that the mission to quell the insurrection was kept a state secret.

=== Electing the leader of United Suvadive for Thinadhoo ===
Olha Didi and Hassan Didi, along with Muhammadh Hameed, were among the individuals working to improve conditions in Thinadhoo. However, upon learning of their imminent detention by Maldivian authorities, they were in Addu.

Discussions were held with Thinadhoo residents in Addu, and 190 individuals participated in the voting process to re-establish the United Suvadive Republic and elect a leader from Huvadhoo to lead the movement. Olha Didi and Hassan Didi won the election, with Olha Didi receiving 140 votes. Both Olha Didi and Hassan Didi were 19 years old at the time.

Another meeting was organized in Addu, where it was decided that, on the night of 5 June 1961, supporters of the United Suvadive Republic would enter Thinadhoo from the Baraasil side, arrest Maldivian troops and their representatives, and take them as captives to Addu.

During a subsequent meeting, Afeef Didi, president of the United Suvadive Republic in Addu, called for the reinstatement of the United Suvadive Republic in Huvadhoo Atoll.

=== Turmoil in the south ===
The re-establishment of the United Suvadive Republic in Thinadhoo led to turmoil in the region. New legislation was enacted that authorized imprisonment, confiscation of property, and destruction of homes belonging to anyone who publicly opposed the United Suvadive. Although the population of Huvadhoo Atoll, particularly Thinadhoo, was divided in their support for the United Suvadive Republic, many were hesitant to express dissent due to the harsh penalties.

Before the arrival of the vessel Silvercrest, internal strife erupted in Thinadhoo. According to residents of Gaddhoo, United Suvadive supporters ransacked the island, destroyed properties, and beat residents who disagreed with their cause.

=== Arrival of Silvercrest ===
On 30 January 1962, between 2:30 PM and 3:00 PM, the vessel Silvercrest, commanded by Prime Minister Ibrahim Nasir, arrived at Havaru Thinadhoo. The vessel carried soldiers equipped with five rifles and ten submachine guns.

In anticipation of Silvercrest's arrival, Thinadhoo had constructed a sand wall called "Fasbadi," which was 400 feet long, 4 feet high, and 3 feet wide. This bulletproof wall was located near the front jetty area. Upon sighting Silvercrest, Olha Didi and Hassan Didi urged the people to take cover behind the Fasbadi wall, fearing that the vessel might open fire as it approached the island. Muhammadh Hameed, another senior United Suvadive representative for Thinadhoo, was not present on the island at the time.

=== Failed attempt to capture dhoanis ===
Before approaching Thinadhoo, Silvercrest chased a dhoani (Note: Boat) carrying men and women returning from work on the neighboring island of Kaadeddhoo. It is believed that the capture of the dhoani was an attempt to use it to infiltrate Thinadhoo. When this attempt failed, Silvercrest chased four additional dhoanis returning to Thinadhoo. However, all four attempts were unsuccessful, and Silvercrest fired warning shots that were ignored. As a result of the gunfire, one crew member from one of the dhoanis went into shock and died upon reaching Thinadhoo.

When Prime Minister Ibrahim Nasir ordered his men to the island, some locals went into shock, vomited, and later died due to the trauma of hearing gunshots and witnessing the destruction of boats and buildings.

Following the failure to capture the four dhoanis, Silvercrest intercepted another dhoani approaching from the south of Kaadeddhoo and took it to Thinadhoo.

=== Shooting at Havaru Thinadhoo ===
After approaching the island, Silvercrest used loudspeakers to call on the people of Thinadhoo to surrender and raise the Maldivian flag in place of the United Suvadive Republic flag. Prime Minister Ibrahim Nasir promised a pardon for anyone who complied. However, following the announcement, Silvercrest opened fire on Thinadhoo. Shocked residents watched as the leaves and branches of breadfruit trees near the Vaaruge (Tax House) splintered, and birds flew away in response to the noise.

The shooting resulted in the death of one person and the injury of numerous others. Many also died as a result of the shock caused by witnessing the violence and the subsequent forced relocation.

=== Capture of Zakariya Moosa and further warnings ===
After failing to capture the dhoanis, Zakariya Moosa, who had been taken hostage from one of the boats, was brought to Thinadhoo as a messenger to warn the residents. He was instructed to swim to the island while holding onto a wooden plank that had been shot multiple times. Prime Minister Ibrahim Nasir observed the events from Silvercrest using binoculars. Zakariya Moosa successfully reached Thinadhoo and delivered the warning to surrender and raise the Maldivian flag.

Despite this warning, the people of Thinadhoo refused to comply. Zakariya Moosa was subsequently imprisoned by United Suvadive supporters in the Thinadhoo food store.

=== Anchoring of Silvercrest ===
The Silvercrest used loudspeakers to deliver the warning, and it continued firing towards Thinadhoo until dusk that day. Following sunset, supporters of United Suvadive moved their forces inside Thinadhoo to prevent anyone from announcing their surrender. After issuing warnings and firing at Thinadhoo until dusk, Silvercrest sailed to the nearby island of Maakiri Gala, where it anchored for the night.

=== Messengers with word of surrender ===
On the morning following daybreak in Thinadhoo, Havaru Thinadhoo resident Moosa Fathuhi met with two other individuals - Abdul Wahhab from Bansaarige, who was the Secretary at the Atoll Office, and Mohamed Hussain from Maabadeyrige, who was a police officer. Moosa Fathuhi was then under house arrest. During their meeting, Moosa Fathuhi and Wahhab discussed surrender, while Mohamed Hussain attempted to persuade the remaining elders in Thinadhoo to surrender as well. However, his efforts were unsuccessful as the elders were concerned about the potential consequences of the new legislation and feared losing their possessions if they were apprehended by United Suvadive supporters. They refused to travel to Silvercrest. In the evening, Abdul Wahhab and Mohamed Hussain left unnoticed by the United Suvadive Thinadhoo supporters on a small boat called Bokkura, which was headed towards Silvercrest. They were on a mission to surrender on behalf of the residents of the island, following the orders of Prime Minister Ibrahim Nasir.

As Abdul Wahhab and Mohamed Hussain approached Silvercrest, soldiers who were preparing to fire illuminated the boat. Upon noticing them, the soldiers boarded the boat and brought them to Prime Minister Ibrahim Nasir, who interrogated them. It is unclear whether the Thinadhoo residents who surrendered on their behalf were granted a pardon, as they were not informed of their status.

After reports surfaced about Abdul Wahhab and Mohamed Hussain's meeting on Silvercrest, United Suvadive supporters in Thinadhoo expressed hostility towards their residences. Both Wahhab and Hussain were willing to attend the meeting as they did not personally own any property in Thinadhoo.

=== Sunrise and preparation for attack ===
Wahhab and Hussain transported all of the remaining prisoners, who had been captured earlier by Silvercrest, to Thinadhoo in the Bokkura. Subsequently, troops and Ibrahim Nasir's aides boarded the Dhoani, which was under their control. The Prime Minister ordered Wahhab and Hussain to board the Dhoani with the military and his subordinates.

=== Torching of Arumaadhu Odis (large ships) ===
The Dhoani, accompanied by the troops and others, sailed towards Havaru Thinadhoo. As it approached the island, it set fire to a large ship called "Fathuhul Mubarak," which was anchored outside and belonged to Havaru Thinadhoo Naib Ismail Didi. Onlookers near the jetty area in Thinadhoo witnessed the burning of the ship.

Subsequently, all the large ships (Arumaadhu Odi) anchored on the outskirts of Thinadhoo were destroyed by fire. These included:

- Arumaadhu Odi "Barakathul Rahman" owned by Mudim Hussain Thakurufaan
- Arumaadhu Odi "Fathuhul Majeed" owned by Muhammad Kaleyfaan
- Naalu Bethelli (large boat) named "Ganima" owned by Abubakuru Katheeb Kaleyfaan
- Naalu Baththeli (large boat) owned by Addu Hithadhoo Finifenmaage Abdullah Afeef

=== Attacking from ashore ===
As the Dhoani and the troops approached Thinadhoo, Abdul Wahhab and Mohamed Hussain received orders to plunge into the shallow waters and employ a rope to pull the Dhoani towards the island. Using a megaphone, the troops then demanded surrender and hoisting of the Maldive flag instead of the Suvadive flag. It was promised that forgiveness would be granted to everyone if these actions were carried out. Subsequently, submachine guns were fired into the air. Prime Minister Ibrahim Nasir's directives were adhered to without hesitation.

As the Dhoani approached the area near Fasbadi in Havaru Thinadhoo, people from the outer wall threw stones at it. Despite the commotion, the troops persisted in firing while exhorting the populace to raise the Maldives flag.

At the jetty area in Havaru Thinadhoo, the flag of the United Suvadive Republic was raised atop a 40-foot-long flagpole. Upon Prime Minister Ibrahim Nasir's demand for surrender, the flag was secured with a rope to prevent its easy removal.

=== Attempt to untie the Suvadive flag ===
Abdul Wahhab attempted to climb the flagpole and untie the flag, but he was repeatedly pelted with stones by United Suvadive supporters, preventing him from completing the task. Meanwhile, the troops on the Dhoani continued to fire at Thinadhoo.

After the Dhoani and its troops reached the other side of the Fasbadi wall, the people throwing rocks at them were no longer shielded by it. They ran to a nearby school called "Madursathul Ameer Ibrahim" without the protection of the wall. Most of them stayed outside, but a few sought refuge inside the school. The leaders of the United Suvadive Republic of Thinadhoo ordered the arrest of some of the town's residents who opposed them within the school.

=== Another messenger with word of surrender ===
At this point, Havaru Thinadhoo Moosa Fathuhy, a respected islander, waded into the shallow water and declared the surrender of the islanders to the Dhoani. When Annabeel Muhammadh Imaddhudheen, who was on board the Dhoani with the army, gave the command to approach, Fathuhy moved closer to the Dhoani.

=== Assault in Thinadhoo. Burning of haruges (boat shelters) ===
The soldier responsible for setting fire to the ships earlier also disembarked on Thinadhoo and proceeded to set Olha Didi Katheeb, the boat shelter of Thinadhoo Katheebs, on fire. The fire consumed the Haruge completely and also destroyed the haruges of Katti Ibrahimbe and Moosa Fathuhy.

=== Surrendering by hoisting the Maldives flag goes unheeded ===
After setting the Haruges on fire and firing at the island, the Dhoani headed towards the main jetty. However, they ceased firing when they noticed the Maldives flag being raised and the United Suvadive Republic flag being lowered. Ali Rasheed, a resident of Havaru Thinadhoo Diamond Villa, was responsible for this action. According to Ali Rasheed, he had attempted to lower the flag earlier, but was unable to do so due to gunfire exchanged between the "Madursathul Ameer Ibrahim" building and the location of the flagpole. Once the Dhoani and the troops left the area, he finally had the opportunity to climb the pole.

=== Continued assault and arrival of Ibrahim Nasir to Thinadhoo ===
Following a brief cessation to lower the United Suvadive flag, the shooting recommenced. Shortly after, Prime Minister Ibrahim Nasir arrived on Thinadhoo.

=== Depopulation and destruction ===
Upon his arrival, Prime Minister Ibrahim Nasir ordered the evacuation of Havaru Thinadhoo by dusk. The command was executed by dispatching soldiers across the island. During the depopulation, soldiers forced all the residents of the island, including women, children, and the elderly, to stand in shallow water up to their necks. The island was then plundered, and its resources were depleted. According to survivors, many people died due to the aftermath of the incident. The population of Thinadhoo was approximately 6,000, and the destruction of boats made it challenging for them to leave the island.

After the evacuation of the island, all the properties on the island were burned and destroyed. After the depopulation, the Maldives government's official publication "Viyafaari Miyadhu" declared that "Havaru Thinadhoo island had no more inhabitants or houses."

Havaru Thinadhoo residents were subjected to imprisonment, torture, and systematic abuse, including rape.

Under dubious circumstances, several leaders of the United Suvadive Republic and numerous others died while in prison in Thinadhoo.

== Aftermath ==
Before its depopulation in 1959, Thinadhoo was estimated to have a population of around 6,000 people. By the time relocation began on August 22, 1966, it was estimated that there were only about 1,800 individuals remaining on the island.

During an event commemorating the 55th anniversary of Thinadhoo's re-population, the Mayor of Addu commented that the forced evacuation of the island's inhabitants was one of the most brutal events in Maldivian history.

=== Transitional justice ===
The situation is being investigated by the Ombudsperson's Office for Transitional Justice. Abdul Salaam Arif, the Chief Ombudsperson, has stated that it will be difficult to uncover the truth if the investigation into the Thinadhoo case is solely focused on its depopulation. He stated that the office explored various venues for the hearing and ultimately decided to expand the scope of public testimony, noting that if the investigation solely focused on the depopulation of Thinadhoo, it would be challenging to uncover the truth.

=== Thinadhoo council demands ===
The Thinadhoo Council has requested that the building previously owned by former Prime Minister Ibrahim Nasir, which was seized by the state, be renamed as "GDh. Thinadhoo Velaanaage" as a form of compensation.

The Thinadhoo Council has made several requests, including renaming the confiscated building of former Prime Minister Ibrahim Nasir as "GDh. Thinadhoo Velaanaage" as a form of restitution. Additionally, they have requested a formal apology from the state to the Thinadhoo people, the restoration of violated rights, and the seizure of 50% of the income from the assets of those responsible, to be given as restitution to the Thinadhoo people for their lifetimes.

=== Presidential apology for past actions ===
In a notable statement made by President Ibrahim Solih, he addressed the historical context of this depopulation, saying, "I must say, the administration treated the people like no administration should. This is something we must apologize for, even today. I apologize, as the head of government." This statement reflects an acknowledgment of the past government's actions and a commitment to addressing the issues related to the depopulation of Thinadhoo.
