= Madaveli =

Madaveli މަޑަވެލި
- Inhabited island
- Location of Madaveli in Maldives
- Coordinates: 00°27′32″N 72°59′52″E
- Country: Maldives
- Administrative atoll: Gaafu Dhaalu Atoll
- Distance to Malé: 414.86 km (257.78 mi)

Area
  - Total: 0.3380 km^{2} (0.1305 sq mi)

Dimensions
  - Length: 1.050 km (0.652 mi)
  - Width: 0.880 km (0.547 mi)

Population (2022) (including foreigners)
  - Total: 1,219
  - Density: 3,607/km^{2} (9,341/sq mi)
- Time zone: UTC+05:00 (MST)

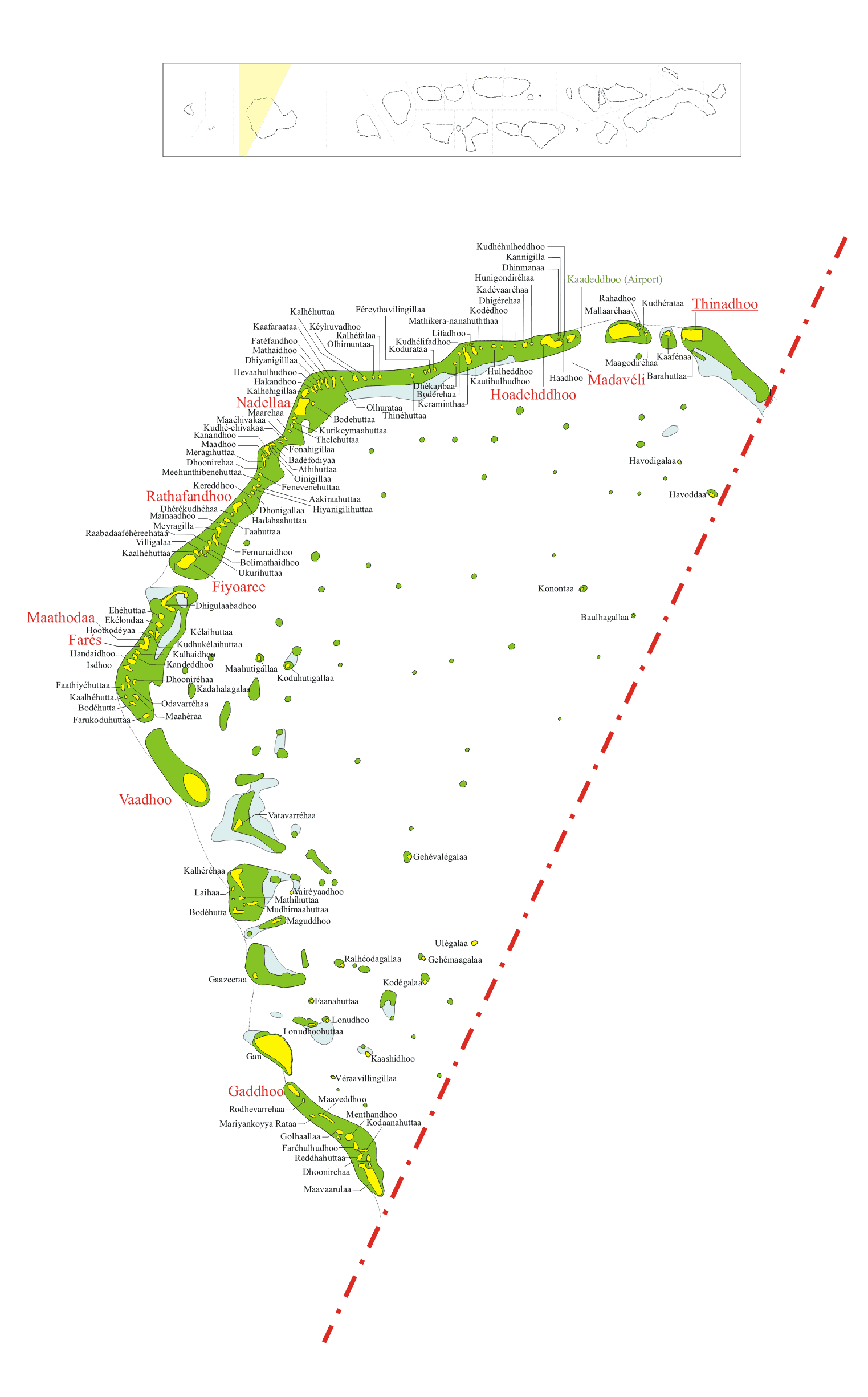
A map of Gaafu Dhaalu Atoll, with Madaveli near the top part of the map.

Madaveli (Dhivehi: މަޑަވެލި) is one of the inhabited islands of Gaafu Dhaalu Atoll. Q1 (island code).

== Geography ==
The island is 414.86 km (258 mi; 224 nmi) south of the country's capital, Malé.

Madaveli is the third largest populated island in the Gaafu Dhaalu Atoll. Geographically the island of Madaveli sits on the front of a long reef stretching from Madaveli to Faresmaathodaa and can be tracked on foot in low tide.

== History ==
While it is unclear as to when people started living in Madaveli, considering the similarity in the dialect spoken in the island Huvadhoo Bas as it is spoken in other islands of the Huvadhu Atoll, it is safe to assume that people started living here as early as civilization in the atoll can be traced. Many generations of people living in Madaveli claim inheritance from a number of other islands including Fuvahmulah. Royal ancestries can be found in the island, the most notable one being descendants of the Royal Household of Karayya Ganduvaru of Fuvahmulah who usually adopt the suffix "dhee dhee" after their name. Other ancesttral families in the island include Mudhin family named after their patriarch who was the local Muaddin and many academics are from this family.

== Demography ==
Historical population
Year	Pop.	±%
2006	1,065	—
2014	1,155	+8.5%
2022	1,219	+5.5%
2006-2022: Census populations Source:

== Governance ==
- Madaveli Council President: Hameez Ahmed (Jumhooree Party candidate) http://madaveli.gov.mv/members/
- Madaveli Council Vice President: Azam Mohamed (Jumhooree Party candidate)

== Economy ==
Fishing is the main source of income while few resorts and a domestic airport nearby provides alternative sources of income to the islanders.

== Education ==
There is one school in Madaveli. Madaveli School teaches from LKG to Grade 10 students.

== Sports and recreation ==
Popular sports include football, bashi, volleyball and swimming.

== Transport ==
Madaveli residents travel nearby islands by speed boat, launch and ferry. There is regular ferry (Baahaththari dhoani) from Madaveli to Thinadhoo within six days a week. Speed launches available at request from Madaveli to Thinadhoo or within the atoll. There is regular MTCC ferry within the atoll.

Kaadedhdhoo Airport is situated on a nearby island.
