= Jamaluddin School =

Primary and secondary school in Malé, Maldives

- ޖަމާލުއްދިން ސްކޫލް
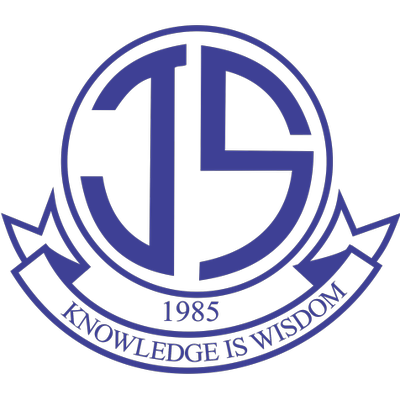

Location
- Rah Dhebai Magu; Galolhu; Malé, Kaafu Atoll; Maldives
- Coordinates: 4.172758°N 73.509790°E

Information
- Former name: Jamaluddin Primary School
- School type: Primary and Secondary Government
- Motto: Knowledge is Wisdom
- Religious affiliation: Islam
- Established: 16 February 1985
- Status: Active
- Administrator: Mohamed Shafeeg (2021)
- Principal: Aishath Sheetha
- Language: Dhivehi & English
- Hours in school day: 6
- Color: Blue
- Last updated: 3 August 2024

Jamaluddin School is a government run school located in Galolhu district, Malé, Maldives. It is the second Primary School to be opened in Malé. The school has participated and won in many interschool competitions.

== History ==
The foundation of the school was laid down on 11 November 1979 by President Maumoon Abdul Gayoom. Jamaluddin was inaugurated on 16 February 1985 by President Gayoom. The school is named after religious scholar Mohamed Jamaaluddin. It was opened as Jamaluddin Primary School.

In 1985, the school officially began with more than 800 students and 33 teachers including the Principal, Senior Assistant Principal and a Supervisor. During its inception, it only had one session, grades 1-2 and a class for handicapped children. Grade 3 was later introduced in 1986 and the school had three working sessions, grade 4 was started in 1987. Jamaluddin Primary School was changed to its current name in 1990 and the school badge changed from JPS to JS. Grade 5 classes started and sessions were changed to two with longer hours. In 1991 the four Houses, Burakirani (Red), Koimala (Violet), Siththimava (Gold) and Thukkala (Green) were formed. All the students and teachers were divided into these houses. In 1998, Jamaluddin School was the first primary School to have grade 6 classes.

Jamaluddin was shifted to a new building with modern facilities on 6 February 2000. In 2008, the school motto changed from "Wisdom is Knowledge" to "Knowledge is Wisdon". In October, a dictionary for Maldivian Sign Language was prepared by the school. In 2011, Secondary grades were started and grade 8 was introduced.

In 2021, Nuha Rilwan made history by being the first Maldivian to achieve Woman FIDE Master.

In 2023, Ikan Waleed is the youngest person to secure a spot in the National Men's Chess team.
