= Afeef =

Afeef is a surname. Notable people with the surname include:

- Abdullah Afeef (1916–1993), President of the United Suvadive Republic
- Hassan Afeef, Maldivian film actor
