= Fiyoaree =

Fiyoaree ފިޔޯރީ
- Inhabited island
- Location in Maldives
- Coordinates: 0°13′25″N 73°8′10″E
- Country: Maldives
- Geographic atoll: Huvadhu Atoll
- Administrative atoll: Gaafu Dhaalu Atoll
- Distance to Malé: 438.92 km (272.73 mi)

Government
  - Island Chief: Faixar Rasheed

Dimensions
  - Length: 1.73 km (1.07 mi)
  - Width: .73 km (0.45 mi)

Population (2014)
  - Total: 1,533 (excluding foreigners)
- Time zone: UTC+05:00 (MST)

Fiyoaree or Fiori (Dhivehi: ފިޔޯރީ) is one of the inhabited islands of Gaafu Dhaalu Atoll, Maldives.

== History ==
Women of this island used to weave mats of good quality than those of Gaddu, but in larger quantities.

=== Archaeology ===
There are sizeable Buddhist ruins on this island which have been largely unexplored. The most important one is a ruin, probably a large Stupa, measuring about 32 feet in circumference and 3 feet in height, found on the western side of the island.

These archaeological remains have not been properly investigated yet.fiyoaree is the only island where the original raw materials of met(thudukuna)are growing.

== Geography ==
The island is 438.92 km (273 mi; 237 nmi) south of the country's capital, Malé.

== Demography ==
Historical population
Year	Pop.	±%
2006	673	—
2014	689	+2.4%
2006-2014: Census populations Source:
