= Abdullah Afeef =

President of the United Suvadive Republic from 1959 to 1963

- އަބްދުﷲ އަފީފު ދީދީ
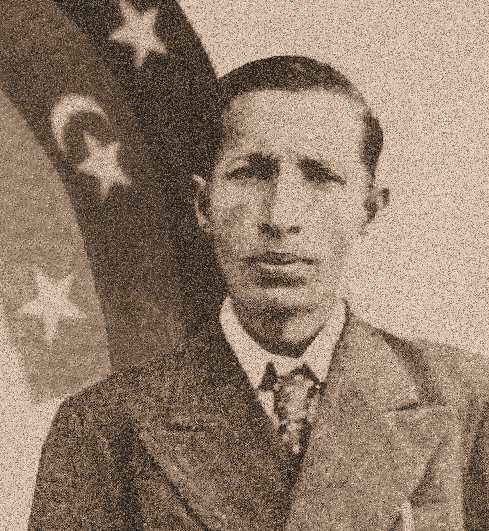

President of the United Suvadive Republic
- In office 2 January 1959 – 23 September 1963
- Preceded by: Office established
- Succeeded by: Office abolished

Personal details
- Born: 1916 Hithadhoo, Addu Atoll, Sultanate of the Maldive Islands
- Died: 13 July 1993 (aged 76–77) Victoria, Seychelles
- Citizenship: Maldivian citizenship Seychellois citizenship
- Spouse: Aneesa Ali Didi
- Children: Ahmed Afif

Abdullah Afeef (1916 – July 13, 1993) was the only President of the United Suvadive Republic from 1959 to 1963. Born in Hithadhoo, Addu Atoll, Afeef was an educated and well-respected individual from a family of notables. Owing to his knowledge of the English language, he served as a translator to the British military at Gan airbase in the same atoll. His local name was Elha Didige Ali Didige Afeefu.

Abdullah Afeef was the breakaway nation's first and only president. The Suvadive government was unceremoniously dismantled by the British and the Maldive Islands' government representatives in 1963. Following this, Abdullah Afeef was exiled to the Seychelles where he died about 30 years later. Southern islanders still remember him fondly as "our Afeefu".

== Insurrection of the Addu Islanders ==
During the 1950s, the government of the Maldive Islands (now Maldives) sought to implement certain centralizing measures. As a result, there was discontent in the Southern Atolls.

In Addu Atoll there were riots against the central Maldive government in the year 1958.

Among those who were involved in the uprising against the militiamen of the central government posted in Addu was Abdullah Afeefu.

In Addu Atoll there was a British air base in the island of Gan. The new prime minister of the Maldive Islands had appointed Abdullah Afeef as the liaison officer between the British and the locals. Shortly afterwards, in December 1958, the government announced plans for a new tax on boats. This caused riots throughout the atoll again, leading to several attacks on Maldive government buildings. Once again, the officials of the Government of the Maldive Islands were forced to retreat to the safety of the British barracks. This time Abdullah Afeef saved the lives of the Maldive officials by warning them of the impending unrest.

== Presidency ==
Four days later, on 3 January 1959 a delegation of the Addu people arrived on Gan and declared their independence to the British. The delegation also demanded that Adullah Afeef be their leader. Afeef was chosen to lead the nascent Suvadive government because of British insistence that a trustworthy leader whom they were familiar with be chosen, as a precondition for them being able to back the secession.

It is said that Afeef initially refused, and that he accepted the role of becoming the executive head of the new state only under heavy pressure.

The fledgling Suvadive state was soon joined by the other two Southern atolls of Huvadu and Fua Mulaku.

In his first year as president, Afeef pleaded for support and recognition from Britain in the 25 May 1959 edition of The Times of London

"...The presence of the British in Addu Atoll had absolutely nothing to do with the will of the people to break from Malé. Attempts have been made before and as recently as 18 months ago men were imprisoned for trying to make an improvement. The RAF at Gan Island had no knowledge of our intention to make an uprising on the first day of 1959. It was calculated action by the people to show Malé that we are determined never again to submit to the despotic rule of a government of one family.

"...We earnestly appeal to your great and generous country for help and understanding. We have been inhabiting these islands from time immemorial, possessing thereby inalienable rights over them. The ownership thereof cannot certainly be claimed by the Malé Government. We therefore appeal to the British Government to kindly grant us facilities to open negotiations at once with a view to conclude a Treaty of friendship and co-operation between Her Majesty's Government and the United Suvadive Islands.

"We hope the British Government and people will appreciate the justice of our cause and recognize the United Suvadive Islands at once.

However, Afeefu's pleas went unheeded and the British Government never recognized the "United Suvadive Islands". Instead the initial British measure of lukewarm support for the small breakaway nation was withdrawn in 1961, when the British signed a treaty with the Maldive Islands without involving Afeef. Following that treaty the Suvadives had to endure an economic embargo and attacks from gunboats sent by the Maldive government. Without the support of the British, the Suvadive republic was on the brink of collapse.

== Exile ==
Finally, in October 1963, the United Suvadive Republic was unceremoniously dismantled and the flag was hoisted over the main Suvadive government building in Hithadoo Island. Abdullah Afeef went into exile to the Seychelles with his immediate family aboard the British warship HMS Loch Lomond.

Within the Maldives, Afeef remains a controversial figure. The blame of the Suvadive "Rebellion" (Baghaavaiy) as it is still known in Maldives, was put squarely on Afeefu's shoulders and on the British. Following the failed rebellion, Afeef was officially declared a traitor to the Maldives, and a puppet of the British.

Despite official condemnation, Afeef is respected and admired by many Southern Maldivians who claim him as a man of integrity who was simply a victim of circumstance. Despite having studied in Cairo, Egypt, Afeef had a far more secular and progressive outlook than many of his contemporaries. Owing to his secularism and his admiration for the British, he was abjectly ridiculed and mocked as a "Kafir" or infidel by the press in Malé, but among many Southern Maldivians, he is esteemed for his forward thinking and personal integrity.

After 1963, Abdullah Afeef lived in Victoria, Mahe Island, in the Seychelles with his wife and children. From the Seychelles, Afeef made repeated requests to the Maldivian government to visit his home island of Addu Atoll, to see his family, but the Maldivian authorities persistently ignored his requests for the next 30 years. Shortly before his death on 13 July 1993, when he was old and in precarious health, Afeef was permitted to travel to Addu to see his relatives. However, an official pardon was not granted.

== Genealogy ==
President Afeef Didi was the son of Ali Didi son of Hithadhoo Elha Didi (Mohamed Didi) son of Kalhihaaru Dhon Ali Thakurufan of Meedhoo son of Dhondhiyege Faathumaifaan daughter of Elhagedharige Hussein Thakurufaan son of Kudhuraniage Ibrahim Thakurufan son of Kudhuraniage Faathumafaan daughter of Ibrahim Naib Thakurufaan son of Vazeeul Kabeer Mohamed Bodufuiy Thakurufaan son of Chief Justice Hussein Quthubuddeen son of Chief Justice Mohamed Shamsuddeen (also known as Addu Bodu Fandiyaaru Thakurufan).

Afeef Didi's mother was Fathima Didi daughter of Aishath Didi daughter of (Gan'duvaru) Dhon Didi daughter of Aminath Didi daughter of Maradhoo Mudhingey Mariyam Manikufaan and An-Nabeel Moosa Didi (Kilegefaanuge Moosa Didi) son of Al-Ameer Abdulla (Ibrahim Faamuladheyri Kilegefaan) who was the only surviving son of Sultan Mohamed Ghiyasuddin son of Sultan Ibrahim Iskandar II son of Sultan Mohamed Imaduddin Al-Muzaffar (Imaduddin II) of the Dhiyamigili Dynasty.

Diyamigi dynasty ancestry of Abdulla Afeef Didi

Sultan Muzaffar Muhammad Imadudeen
Sultan Ibrahim Iskandar II
Sultan Muhammed Ghiya'as ud-din
Prince Abdulla ( Ibrahim Faamuladheyri Kilegefan )
Edhurugey Moosa Didi
Aminath Didi
Dhon Didi
Aishath Didi
Fathmath Didi
Abdulla Afeef Didi
