= Maadhoo =

Maadhoo may refer to the following places in the Maldives:

- Maadhoo (Gaafu Dhaalu Atoll)
- Maadhoo (Kaafu Atoll)
