= Vaadhoo (Gaafu Dhaalu Atoll) =

Inhabited island of the Maldives

- Inhabited island
- Location in Maldives
- Coordinates: 00°13′45″N 73°16′30″E
- Country: Maldives
- Administrative atoll: Gaafu Dhaalu Atoll
- Distance to Malé: 437.12 km (271.61 mi)

Government
  - Council: Vaadhoo Council

Area
  - Total: 1.673 km^{2} (0.646 sq mi)

Dimensions
  - Length: 2.320 km (1.442 mi)
  - Width: 1.130 km (0.702 mi)

Population (2014)
  - Total: 712 (including foreigners)
  - Density: 426/km^{2} (1,100/sq mi)
- Time zone: UTC+05:00 (MST)

Vaadhoo ( Dhivehi: ވާދޫ ) is an inhabited island of Gaafu Dhaalu region in the atoll of Huvadhu, Maldives. It has its own dialect of Maldivian, which is considerably different from northern and Mid-Maldivian speech.

== History ==
=== Archaeology ===
Important Buddhist remains have been found on this island, including:

- A ruined stupa called “Vaadhoo Bodu Havitta” is located on the north-east of the centre of the Island. It is about 90m in circumference and 12 m in height.
- On the north-east of the centre of the island is another mount (Vaadhoo Kuda Havitta) which is about 40 m in circumference and 7 m in height.
- An ancient cemetery knows as “Thunndey Ziyaarai” located on the north-west side of the Island.
- “Vaadhoo Gale Misskih” an ancient Graveyard and a mosque located on the north-east of the centre of the Island.
- “Vaadhoo Dhanna Kaleyfaanu Ziyaarai” known as the grave yard of “Mohamed Jamaaluddin” (Vaadhoo Dhanna Kaleyfaanu) who is one of the important scholars of Maldives.
- “Vaadhoo Aasaaree Misskih” An old mosque where “Mohamed Jamaaluddin” (Vaadhoo Dhanna Kaleyfaanu) started his teachings with the help of Vaadhoo Katheeb (Mohamed Fadiyahthakuru).
- "Bulhannaab" an ancient Graveyard located on the north-east side of the Island.

Thor Heyerdahl visited this island and investigated the ancient Buddhist ruins in the 1980s accompanied by Mohamed Lutfi. Some carved coral stones representing Buddha's foot (Buddhapada) include Vajrayana symbols that were found. However, the ruins have not been well researched yet.

== Geography ==
The island is 437.12 km (272 mi; 236 nmi) south of the country's capital, Malé.

== Demography ==
Historical population
Year	Pop.	±%
2006	662	—
2014	661	−0.2%
2006–2014: Census populations Source:

== Education ==
Vaadhoo Jamaaluddin School, a government primary and secondary school, which is the second primary school opened in Gdh Vaadhoo. The school is named after the famous religious scholar Mohamed Jamaluddin, better known as Vaadhoo Dhanna Kaleyfaanu and the first Educator of the Maldives. The school first name was called "Vaadhoo Makthab" later changed for "Jamaaluddin School" and currently known as "Vaadhoo Jamaaluddin School".

== See also ==
- Vaadhoo Caves
