= Kaadedhdhoo Airport =

Kaadedhdhoo Airport ކާޑެއްދޫ އެއަރޕޯޓް
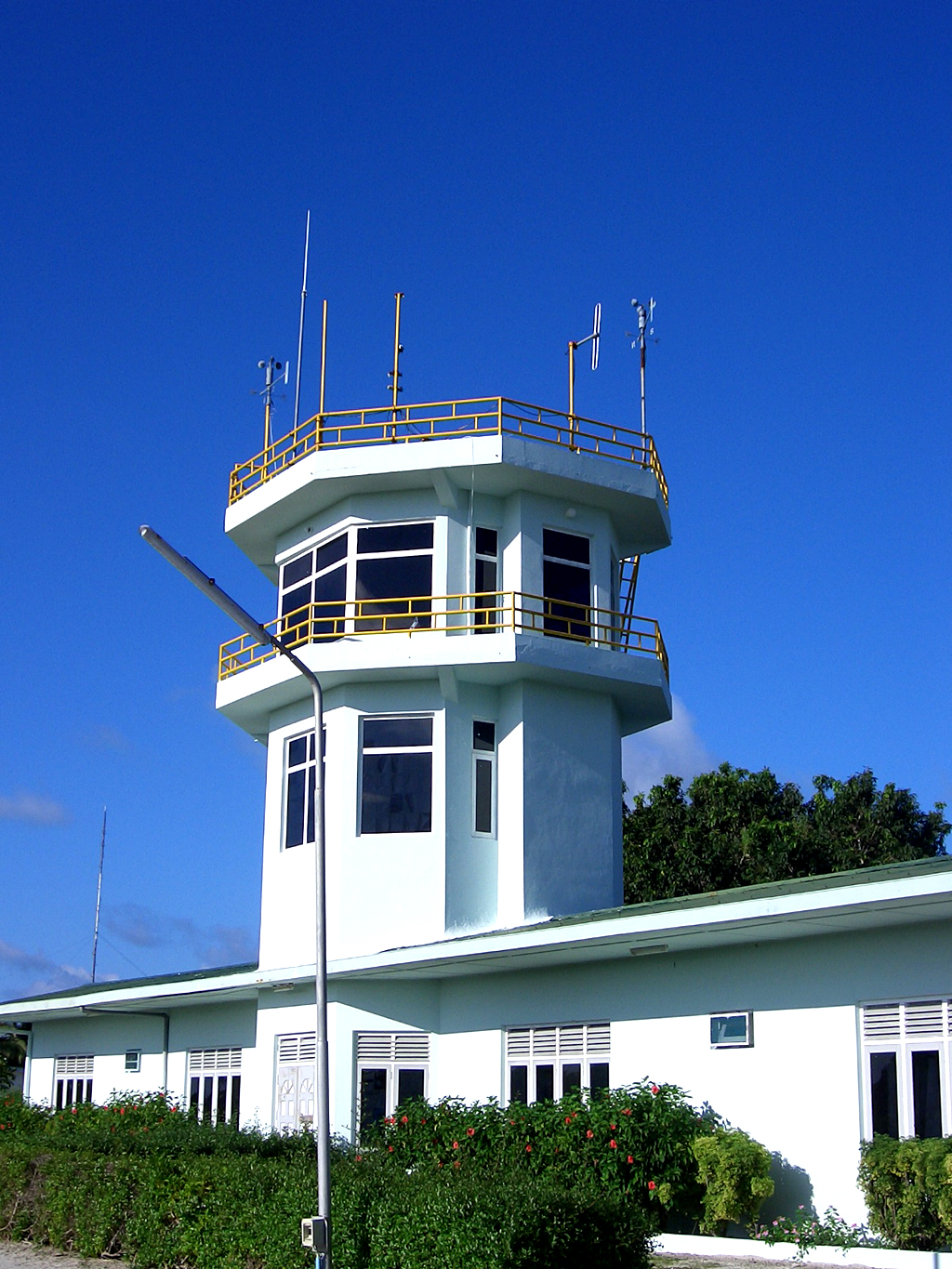
- Kaadedhdhoo Meteorological Office
- IATA: KDM; ICAO: VRMT

Summary
- Airport type: Public
- Operator: Regional Airports Company Limited
- Serves: Huvadhu Atoll, Maldives
- Location: Kaadedhdhoo, Gaafu Dhaalu Atoll
- Elevation AMSL: 2 ft (0.61 m)
- Coordinates: 00°29′17″N 072°59′49″E
- Website: airports.com.mv/...

Map
- Location in Maldives

Runways
Direction	Length		Surface
Direction	m	ft	Surface
16/34	1,220	4,003	Bituminous
- Sources: Airport website, DAFIF

Kaadedhdhoo Airport (IATA: KDM, ICAO: VRMT) is a domestic airport on the island of Kaadedhdhoo in Gaafu Dhaalu (South Huvadhu) atoll, Maldives. The airport is located 3.7 kilometres (2.0 NM) south of Thinadhoo. It was opened on 10 December 1993, by President Maumoon Abdul Gayoom.

== Facilities ==
The airport resides at an elevation of 2 feet (0.6 m) above mean sea level. It has one runway designated 16/34 with a bituminous surface measuring 1,220 by 30 metres (4,003 ft × 98 ft).

== Airlines and destinations ==
Airlines offering scheduled passenger service:

Airlines	Destinations
Maldivian	Fuvahmulah, Gan, Kadhdhoo, Malé
