= Fares-Maathodaa =

Fares-Maathodaa ފަރެސްމާތޮޑާ
- Inhabited island
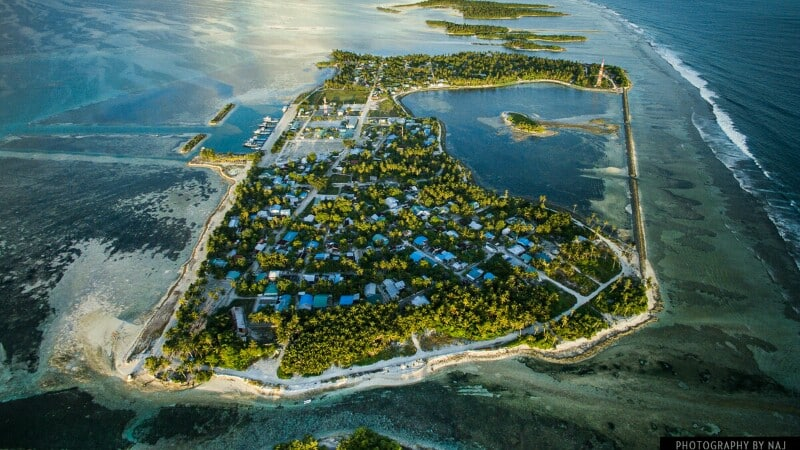

- Location in Maldives
- Coordinates: 0°11′55″N 73°11′25″E
- Country: Maldives
- Geographic atoll: Huvadhu Atoll
- Administrative atoll: Gaafu Dhaalu Atoll
- Distance to Malé: 441.15 km (274.12 mi)

Dimensions
  - Length: 1.36 km (0.85 mi)
  - Width: 5.07 km (3.15 mi)

Population (2014)
  - Total: 1,104 (including foreigners)
- Time zone: UTC+05:00 (MST)

Fares-Maathodaa (Dhivehi: ފަރެސްމާތޮޑާ) is one of the inhabited islands of Gaafu Dhaalu Atoll. Fares and Maathoda were originally two separate islands until they were joined by the reclamation of the shallow water passage between them during 1990s. Today, unified as one, the locals livelihood is mostly dependent on fishing.

== Geography ==
The island is 441.15 km (274 mi; 238 nmi) south of the country's capital, Malé, and covers an area of 48.7 hectares

== Demography ==
Historical population
Year	Pop.	±%
2006	936	—
2014	1,028	+9.8%
2006-2014: Census populations Source:
