= Rathafandhoo =

Rathafandhoo ރަތަފަންދޫ/ ރަތަފަންދުއާ
- Inhabited island
- Location in Maldives
- Coordinates: 00°15′13″N 73°06′18″E
- Country: Maldives
- Administrative atoll: Gaafu Dhaalu Atoll
- Distance to Malé: 435.96 km (270.89 mi)

Area
  - Total: 0.3716 km^{2} (0.1435 sq mi)

Dimensions
  - Length: 1.275 km (0.792 mi)
  - Width: 0.250 km (0.155 mi)

Population (2022)
  - Total: 431 (including foreigners)
  - Density: 1,160/km^{2} (3,000/sq mi)
- Time zone: UTC+05:00 (MST)

Rathafandhoo (Dhivehi: ރަތަފަންދޫ) is an inhabited island of the Gaafu Dhaalu Atoll, Maldives.

== Geography ==
The island is 435.96 km (271 mi; 235 nmi) south of the country's capital, Malé. The island is located on the southwest side of South Huvadhu Atoll.

=== Climate ===
The climate is warm and the weather is tropical year round. The temperature averages 25° to 32 °C. Monsoon runs from May to November. The islands are closely situated to the Indian coast, are strongly affected by mainland Asian weather patterns, though do not experience serious monsoons.

== Demography ==
Historical population
Year	Pop.	±%
2006	492	—
2014	515	+4.7%
2022	431	−16.3%
Census populations Source:

== Governance ==
=== Police ===
In late 2008, the Maldives Police Service opened a station on the island, with three police personnel.

== Education ==
Primary and secondary education on the island is provided by Rathafandhoo School, with 155 students and 21 teachers. Pre-schools are available.

== Healthcare ==
The Health Centre provides basic health care to the islanders for minor injuries, cuts, common colds and flu. If a serious health issue arises, islanders must go to the regional hospital located in the atoll capital Thinadhoo. The journey takes about 45 minutes via speed boat.

== Economy ==
The most common sources of paid work for residents include mat weaving, agriculture, reef fishing and carpentry and fishing for sea cucumbers, tuna and reef fish.

The islanders are famous for handicrafts and making nets (kunaa), made from a local plant called Hau. Some islanders weave mats, as souvenirs for visitors.

=== Sea cucumber fishery ===
One of the main economic activities on the island is the sea cucumber fishery. The island is the collection center and major base for sea cucumber fisherman who fish in the southern part of the Maldives (Huvadhoo, Fuvahmulah and Addu city.) More than 10 registered companies carry out collecting, cooking, and drying the sea cucumbers for export to China.

=== NGOs ===
Several non-governmental organizations are registered on the island, including some inactive ones, such as RASFARI and READY (Rathafandhoo Eminent Association of Dynamic Youth).
