= United Suvadive Republic =

Country within the Maldives

United Suvadive Republic: އެކުވެރި ސުވާދީބު ޖުމްހޫރިއްޔާ (Dhivehi); Ekuveri Suvaadheebu Jumhooriyyaa
- 1958–1963
- Flag Coat of arms
- Anthem: "Suvadive Qaumi Salaam"
- Status: Unrecognized state
- Capital: Hithadhoo
- Common languages: Dhivehi
- Religion: Islam
- Government: Republic
- President
  - 1959–1963: Abdullah Afeef Didi
- Historical era: Post-war era
  - Independence declared: 1958
  - Disestablished: October 1963
- Currency: Pound sterling
- Today part of: Maldives

The United Suvadive Republic (Dhivehi: އެކުވެރި ސުވާދީބު ޖުމްހޫރިއްޔާ) was a short-lived breakaway state from the Sultanate of Maldives that existed between 1958 and 1963, consisting of the three southern atolls of the Maldive archipelago: Addu Atoll, Huvadhu Atoll, and Fuvahmulah. The first president of the nation was Abdulla Afeef Didi. The republic's secession occurred during the struggles of the Maldives' emergence as a modern nation. The United Suvadive Republic inherited a Westminster system of governance cloned from the United Kingdom, along with other institutional structures.

== Etymology ==
The name "Suvadive" is derived from Huvadhoo Atoll. Suvadiva, Suvaidu or Suvadive (Dhivehi: ސުވާދީބު) is the ancient name for Huvadhoo Atoll. The early seventeenth-century French navigator François Pyrard referred to Huvadhoo as "Suadou".

== State of affairs ==
Historically, the southern atolls of the Maldives were more affluent than their northern counterparts. This prosperity was largely due to the region’s fertile soils, dense vegetation, and an active seafaring culture that facilitated trade abroad. In contrast, wealth in the northern atolls was centralized under royal control and came primarily from foreign sailor-merchants. These differing economic structures fostered distinct political cultures: while the north developed along more despotic lines, the south saw the emergence of more democratic traditions.

The Crown held a monopoly over valuable resources such as grey and black amber and black coral, employing agents to collect them. All foreign ships trading with the Maldives were required to declare their cargo, offer the Sultan first choice at a price he set, and sell any remaining goods to the public—often at inflated prices compared to what the Crown had paid.

The southern atolls, particularly Huvadhoo, developed robust maritime industries and constructed fleets of large trading vessels known as Arumaadu Odi, with each of the vessels ranging from 100 to 200 deadweight tons. These ships, which remained in operation until the 1960s, featured full decks, deck-houses, and prominent overhanging forecastles. At the height of its maritime activity, Havaru Thinadhoo maintained nine such vessels, while Gadhdhoo had two, Nilandhoo three, and Dhaandhoo two—making a total of sixteen long-haul ships from Huvadhoo. Thinadhoo gained a reputation across the Indian Ocean for its frequent voyages and was considered the wealthiest island in the country until it was forcibly depopulated and destroyed.

In the 19th and early 20th centuries, many Maldivian Arumaadu Odi sailed as far west as Aden and as far east as Sumatra, underscoring the islands' longstanding maritime capabilities.

This independent accumulation of wealth outside of the Sultan's economic control enabled the southern atolls to evolve into a nascent thalassocracy.

The first President of the United Suvadive Republic, Abdulla Afeef Didi, emphasized in a letter to the editor of The Times that the republic's formation was entirely homegrown, free from external influence. According to him, the goal was to establish a government elected by the people and to pursue economic development unhindered by the central monarchy. However, Economic and Political Weekly noted that the timing of the secession coincided with the negotiations over Gan Airport, even though the Maldivian Sultan had accused the British of inciting the movement.

== Overview of the southern atolls ==
A map of the three atolls of the United Suvadive Republic.

=== Geography ===
The southern atolls consist of Huvadhu Atoll, Fuvahmulah, and Addu Atoll. These three atolls are separated from the northern atolls by the Huvadu Kandu, which is the broadest channel between any atolls of the Maldives. It is known as the One and a Half Degree Channel in the British Admiralty charts.

==== Huvadu Atoll ====
Huvadhu Atoll is the largest atoll in the Maldives archipelago, having an area of about 2,900 km^{2} (1,120 miles²) and around 255 islands within its boundary. It is recognized in the Guinness World Records as the atoll with the most islands in the world. It is a well-defined atoll with almost a continuous rim-reef with a deep lagoon.

==== Fuvahmulah ====
Fuvahmulah is an atoll with one single large island in the Equatorial Channel.

==== Addu Atoll ====
Addu Atoll marks the southern end of the Maldivian archipelago. It is formed with large islands on its eastern and western side fringed by broad barrier reefs.

=== Southern aristocracy ===
The southern aristocracy of the Maldives consists of the intelligentsia and descendants of exiled kings, many of whom trace their lineage to the royal dynasties of the Maldives. This includes rulers such as Sultan Mohamed IV and exiled figures like Sultan Hasan X and Sultan Ibrahim Muzhiruddine, as well as descendants of Sultan Muhammed Ghiya’as ud-din.

These lineages form the foundation of the royal houses of Isdu, Devvadhoo, and Diyamigili. Historically, high-ranking political figures and former sultans were often exiled to the southern island of Fua Mulaku.

A significant number of chief justices who served the Sultanate of the Maldives also hailed from the southern atolls.

One notable exile was Prince Abdulla, later known as Ibrahim Faamuladheyri Kilegefan, who was banished at the age of nine to Fuvahmulah after his father, Sultan Muhammed Ghiya'asuddin, was overthrown. His family's lands were confiscated, and many of his supporters were also banished. Sultan Ghiya’asuddin is believed to have been killed following his return from the Hajj pilgrimage to Mecca. Numerous descendants of his lineage reside in the southern Maldives.

Ibrahim Nasir, who served as Prime Minister during the formation of the United Suvadive Republic, was born in Fuvahmulah. He shared a common ancestor with Afeef Didi, the president of the Suvadive Republic, with both being descendants of Ibrahim Faamuladheyri Kilegefan, the son of Sultan Ghiya'as ud-din.

Until the ratification of the 1932 Constitution, royal descendants living in Addu, Huvadhu, and Fuvahmulah were exempt from paying the vaaru (poll tax).

=== Governance ===
Ancient flag of the Huvadu Atoll Chief

The governing bodies of the three atolls consisted of families who are related with extended families managing the atolls. The southern atolls were always self-governed due to the southern and northern atolls being separated by the largest oceanic gap between any other atoll of Maldives, the Huvadhu Kandu. Important governing positions in the southern atolls were hereditary.

Historically, the Huvadu atoll chief had the privilege to fly his own flag in his vessels and at his residence, something which was not granted to any other atoll chief of the Maldives.

=== Direct trade ===
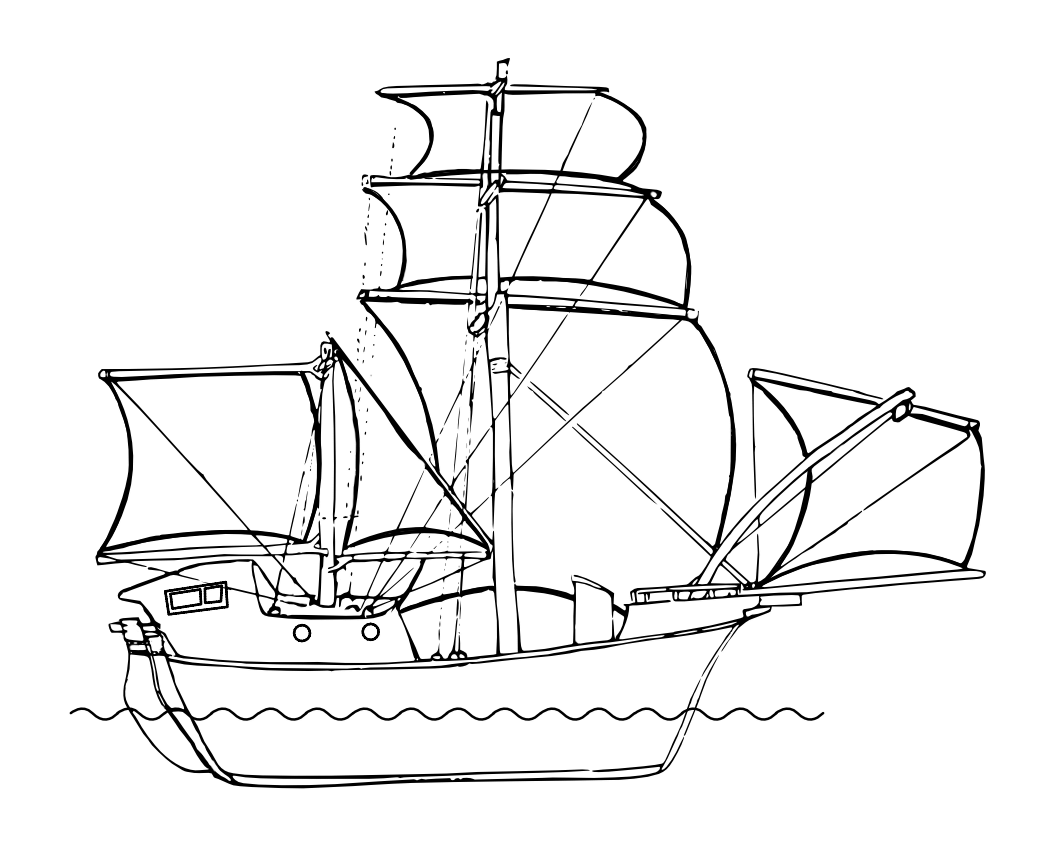
Long-distance 100 to 200 dead-weight tonnage ships.

Most direct trade among the northern atolls in the Maldives passed through Malé with the exception of a few affluent families native to the area. The southern traded directly with ports in Ceylon, India and the East Indies until the Sultanate of the Maldives was abolished.This trade from the southern atolls created a wealthy mercantile class in the atolls of Huvadu and Addu.

The Sultanate also had no options to post agents in the southern atolls for tax collection due to those atolls being too remote. Even if an agent was placed, there were no strong alliances that would result in the tax being collected and transferred to the government. Additionally, any northern Maldivian stationed there would "go native" and have their loyalty to the Sultanate reduce after a few years.

It was not uncommon to see long haul dead-weight 100 to 200 tonnage fleets anchored in the southern atolls. Thinadhoo of Huvadu itself had 40 of those ships which were famous throughout the Indian Ocean.

=== Language ===
The southern atoll dialects of the Dhivehi language are distinctly different from the northern language of the Maldives. Each of the three atolls has a different dialect, with Huvadu having multiple dialects.

== Causes of secession ==
=== Trade restrictions ===
World War II discouraged many merchants from trading by ship due to naval activity in the Indian Ocean.

Until then Huvadu and Addu had established frequent trading to the ports of Colombo and Galle in Ceylon. During World War II, the central authorities had their first opportunity to impose restrictions to the southern atolls to restrict trade and gain an advantage over them.

Maldive diplomats in Colombo with the co-operation of the British authorities managed to monitor the southern merchants who traded from Colombo. The central authorities in Maldives exerted requirements to carry passports for the first time in 1947 which were to be issued from Maldives. The impact to the economy due to the trade restrictions was resented by the southern merchants and population.

=== Consequences of heightened control ===
One of the main reasons to the formation of United Suvadive Republic according to a letter sent by Afeef Didi to The Times of London highlighted on the indifference shown by the central government to the people of the southern atolls. This included the government providing lack of elementary needs such as food, clothing, medicine, education, and social welfare. The letter also referred one of the reasons to taxation imposed on the people which caused revolts from those who had nothing to give.

In the letter he also mentioned about the southern atolls being deprived of elementary needs such as government assigned doctors, schooling, communication facilities or public utilities. Seasonal epidemics such as flu, malaria, enteritis, typhoid, diarrhea, conjunctivitis outbreaks caused deaths annually, and when appealed to, the central government refused to help.

Another reason was that food prices being too high in southern atolls due to the central government selling them at high prices while purchasing southern dried fish at lower prices to be exported to Ceylon.

Furthermore, the Maldives' economic development was hampered by a lack of land-based resources and human capital, as well as a long-standing feudal structure. The Maldives lacked the necessary infrastructure (ports, airports, hospitals, schools, harbors, and telecommunications, as well as people resources) to enter the twenty-first century as a self-sufficient nation until the late 1950s and 1960s. Even though the Maldives initially felt the impact of the industrial revolution in Europe in 1850, when Indian merchants brought luxury goods to Malé, residents on the outer islands never experienced such luxury.

Due to the control the central government held over the atolls, all of the riches and education were reserved for the ruling elites and aristocracy of Malé, and islanders lived in isolation from Malé and the rest of the world. In addition to elitism, islanders faced other challenges. Only Malé's elites were allowed to go freely overseas for academics or business, while the rest of the Maldivians were subjected to a number of limitations.

=== Unfair taxation ===
The success of imposing trade restrictions gave the central authorities the opportunity to impose vaaru (poll tax) and varuvaa (land tax) on the southern atolls. The restrictions on trade and the imposition of new taxing angered the population. Due to World War II, the main export of dried fish could not be exported. Additionally, the lack of common staples being imported into the country caused severe privation and even famine.

Trading of even single coconuts or barters to the British troops were recorded through the government by the militia officers stationed in Addu and Havaru Thinadhoo to ensure taxation was imposed.

Riots spread across Hithadhoo on the New Year's Eve of 1959 due to the government announcing new taxation on boats. The impending disaster due to angry mobs trying to attack government facilities was informed by Abdulla Afeef Didi getting the officials to safety in British-controlled areas.

=== Provoking of southern aristocracy ===
The final blow to the harmony of the Southern atolls were from the arrest and physical assault on Ahmed Didi by one of the officials sent from Malé. Ahmed Didi was the son of Elha Didi, who was a member of one of the leading families of Hithadhoo. Ahmed Didi was beaten until he bled from his nose and mouth. News had traveled to the community that he had been beaten to death. As a result, there was an uprising against the official who beat Ahmed Didi. The official fled, taking refuge at the British barracks.

An investigation undertaken by the central authorities prevailed the account of events told by the person who assaulted Ahmed Didi, in turn convicted Abdulla Afeef Didi. He was sentenced to public flogging by two cat o' nine tails, and chili paste rubbed into the wounds.

The investigation was said to have been overlooked by Al-Ameer Hassan Fareed who visited Addu and had soon departed to Colombo afterwards. On the way to Colombo, he met his death from a World War II submarine attack. The Addu nobles were accused of the death of Al-Ameer Hassan Fareed, claiming it to have been due to sorcery and were punished after they were brought to Malé.

=== Halting of constructions in Addu Atoll and limits to development ===
By the end of 1957, the Sultan had appointed Ibrahim Nasir as Prime Minister. After being appointed Ibrahim Nasir had soon ordered the British to halt all construction work in Addu where an airbase and hospital was being built.

Prior to forming of the new nation, hundreds of workers in Addu had modern skills. Some were foremen of electric works, construction, vehicle maintenance and even chefs and were accustomed to living in large houses with tape recorders and imported cigarettes; which were luxurious goods to Maldives at the time. The atoll also had an enormous increase of population from 6000 to 17000 within 19 years due to excellent medical service by the British. Its high skilled worker population had grown to an extent that it was no longer supported by food resources from those who lacked skills which required importation of food.

According to Clarence Maloney in "The Maldives: New Stresses in an Old Nation", Afeef Didi stated that the Sultanate of the Maldives was principally only concerned with the welfare of Malé. Towns other than Malé was an alien concept to Maldivians, hence there is no word that signifies 'Town', 'City' or 'Village' in Maldivian language.

The affluence of Addu and Huvadhu merchants was always resented by the mercantile classes in Malé and lack of cooperation from the capital hindered and limited its economic growth.

== Secession ==
On 3 January 1959, a delegation from Addu arrived in Gan and declared their independence to the British. The delegation also insisted that Afeef Didi be their leader. Consequently, the three southern atolls of Huvadu, Fuamulah and Addu formed the United Suvadive Republic by breaking away from the sovereign authority of the Sultan on 13 March 1959.

== Economy ==
The Suvadive government's economic policies included the establishment of the Addu Trading Corporation (ATC) to manage trade and supply needs. ATC held a monopoly on trading within the atoll, raising significant capital through public shareholding and employing over 26 staff members. The corporation facilitated trade with Ceylon (modern-day Sri Lanka) through an agreement with an Indian businessman, ensuring the export of products like dried tuna and the import of essential goods.

Huvadu Atoll, which was the largest of the three atolls, played a crucial role in the economy due to its rich fishing grounds. The atoll produced much of the higher quality (and hence higher value) tuna that was being exported from the Maldives at the time. Huvadu's contribution provided a significant portion of the exports necessary for trade.

== Administration ==
The administration of the United Suvadive Islands was structured around a 54-member Council, with representatives from all three of the atolls. Addu, being the central atoll, had the most representatives. The Council met every three months to oversee governance, with an executive council of seven members tasked with the day-to-day administration.

Each atoll was managed by an appointed chief and judge, with local governance conducted through atoll committees. In Addu, members of the people's council were elected, and the first presidential election was held in September 1959. The Suvadive government established various ministries, including those of Home Affairs, Public Safety, Justice, and Finance, and provided services such as healthcare, education, and legal adjudication.

Huvadu Atoll, known for its strong local governance and vibrant community, was integrated into this administrative framework. Delegations from Huvadu agreed to join the new nation, contributing representatives to the council and participating in the administrative processes. The local leaders and communities in Huvadu worked closely with the central administration to implement policies and reforms.

The Suvadive administration implemented several reforms, including registration of births, deaths, property, and businesses, and the establishment of educational institutions. Healthcare was notably advanced, with facilities provided by the RAF in Gan and a health center in Feydhoo offering free treatment to locals.

== Suvadive Revolt and leadership of Abdullah Afeef Didi ==
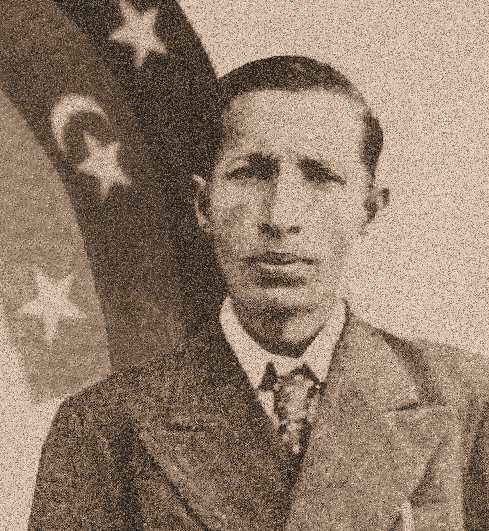
Abdullah Afeef Didi, President of the United Suvadive Republic

The Suvadive Revolt, which began on the final night of 1958, thrust Afeef Didi into a critical leadership role. The revolt was sparked by the Maldivian government's imposition of new taxes and restrictions on the residents of Addu Atoll, particularly those working at the British military base in Gan. The unrest quickly escalated, with local fishermen, traders, and workers uniting against the central government's rule from Malé.

Afeef Didi initially acted to protect Ahmed Zaki, the Maldivian Government Representative, and warn the British at Gan about the impending mob. Afeef Didi took direct action to protect Zaki and warn the British. However, the situation evolved rapidly, and Afeef Didi found himself deeply involved in the frantic efforts to find a suitable leader for the emerging separatist government.

As the revolt intensified, the need for a local leader became urgent. The British political advisor at Gan, Major Phillips, was already engaging with the Hithadhoo men and appeared willing to cooperate with a suitable leader. The initial suggestion of a local Pakistani camp supervisor was rejected by the British, who insisted on a local negotiator. This left only two possibilities: a man in Colombo named Ahmed Didi, and Abdullah Afeef Didi.

=== Depopulation of Havaru Thinadhoo ===
The rebellion was further fueled by several laws enacted in the Maldives that significantly impacted the merchants of Havaru Thinadhoo. These laws included increased tariffs and a new payment mechanism for sold items, requiring transactions to pass through the Maldives government, which caused extended delays in payments to merchants. This new structure severely hindered the island's thriving economy.

Another cause of the second insurrection was the abusive behavior of Maldives government soldiers stationed in Havaru Thinadhoo.

Despite additional appeals made to the Maldives government to improve conditions in Havaru Thinadhoo, no response was received. Karankaa Rasheed, a staff member of the Maldives’ People's Majlis (parliament), stated that no such letter was ever received, and the mission to quell the insurrection was kept a state secret.

On 4 February 1962, the Sultanate of the Maldives reacted by sending a fully armed gunboat to Havaru Thinadhoo commanded by Prime Minister Ibrahim Nasir.

=== Resignation and end of United Suvadive Republic ===
In the face of mounting pressure, Abdullah Afeef Didi resigned from his position as President of the United Suvadive Republic. He accepted an offer of asylum from the British government and was flown to the Seychelles on 30 September 1963.
