= Mohamed Jamaaluddin =

16th century scholar in the Maldives

Mohamed Jamaaluddin (Al-shaykh Muhammadh Jamal al-Din) is an important 16th century scholar and immigrant to Maldives who settled in Vaadu island in the Huvadu atoll of Maldives.

He is also referred to as Jamal-al-Din Huvadu or as Vaadu Dhanna Kilegefaanu meaning "Scholar from Vaadu island". He is known for teaching and advancing other scholars in the region of Maldives.

Maldivian chronicler Hassan Taj Al-Din references Al-shaykh Muhammadh Jamal al-Din as an foreigner who immigrated to Maldives and lists his origin as Hadramawt. He mentions that Al-shaykh Muhammadh Jamal al-Din immigrated to Maldives in the time of Sultan Muhammadh (Muhammad Thakurufaanu Al Auzam, 1573–1585).

Al-shaykh Muhammadh Jamal al-Din's most famous students include:

- Huvadhoo Aboobakuru Fan’diyaaru Kaleygefaanu also known as Qazi Abu Bakr al-Suvaduvi.
- Addu Bodu Fan’diyaaru (Muhammad Shamsudhdheen) Thakurufaanu (Chief Justice)
- Mulaku Dhoodigamu Edhuru Kaleygefaanu

Other educators from his teaching legacy:

- Hassan Thaajudhdheen
- Muhammad Shamsudhdheen
- Ahmed bin Muhammad
- Abdul Hakeem bin Muhammad
- Ali bin Muhammad
- Muhammad Muhibbudhdheen
- Ibrahim Siraajudhdheen
- Ibrahim Majudhudhdheen
- Ibrahim Bahaaudhdheen
- Ibrahim Thakurufaanu (Aisaabeege Dharu Dhonbeyya)
- Muhammad Jamaaludhdheen (Naibu Thuththu)
