= Nadellaa =

- Inhabited island
- Location in Maldives
- Coordinates: 00°17′45″N 73°02′25″E
- Country: Maldives
- Administrative atoll: Gaafu Dhaalu Atoll
- Distance to Malé: 432.13 km (268.51 mi)

Dimensions
  - Length: 0.875 km (0.544 mi)
  - Width: 0.575 km (0.357 mi)

Population (2022)
  - Total: 581 (including foreigners)
- Time zone: UTC+05:00 (MST)

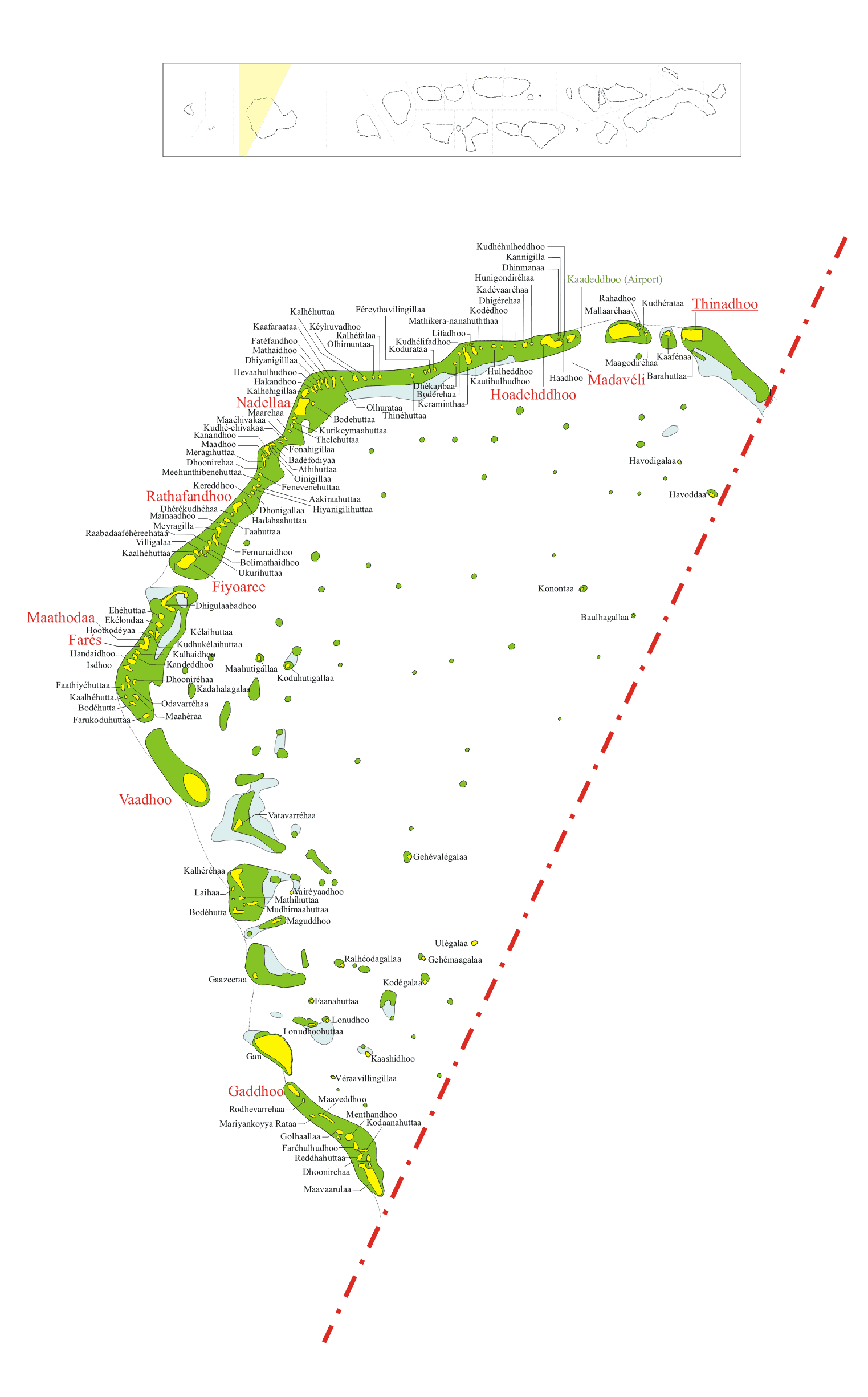
A map of the Gaafu Dhaalu Atoll

Nadellaa (Dhivehi: ނަޑެއްލާ) is one of the inhabited islands of Gaafu Dhaalu Atoll.

== Geography ==
The island is 432.13 km (269 mi; 233 nmi) south of the country's capital, Malé.

== Demography ==
Historical population
Year	Pop.	±%
2006	614	—
2014	738	+20.2%
2022	581	−21.3%
2006-2014: Census populations Source:
