= Thinadhoo City =

Capital of Gaafu Dhaalu Atoll, Maldives

Thinadhoo ތިނަދޫ
- City
- Thinadhoo City
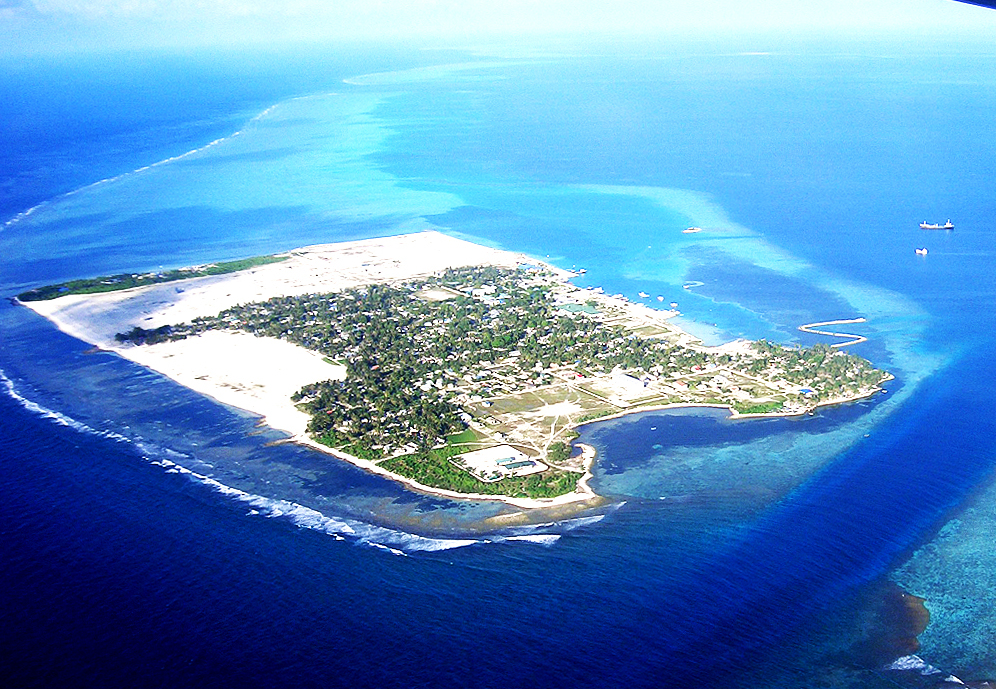

- Location in Maldives
- Coordinates: 0°31′48.83″N 72°59′47.44″E
- Country: Maldives
- Administrative atoll: Gaafu Dhaalu Atoll
- Distance to Malé: 407.06 km (252.94 mi)

Government
  - Council: Thinadhoo City Council

Area
  - Total: 1.192 km^{2} (0.460 sq mi)

Dimensions
  - Length: 1.560 km (0.969 mi)
  - Width: 0.922 km (0.573 mi)

Population (2024)
  - Total: 10,150
  - Density: 8,515/km^{2} (22,050/sq mi)
- Time zone: UTC+05:00 (MST)

Thinadhoo City is the capital of Gaafu Dhaalu region in the atoll of Huvadhu of the Maldives. It has its own dialect of Dhivehi which is considerably different from northern speech.

The name Thinadhoo is derived from Euphorbia hirta, locally known as Thina Vina (Thina Weed), a pantropical weed used for herbal medicines which grew in the island.

The island was formerly known as Havaru Thinadhoo and it was the traditional seat of the Atoll Chief. The island has a vibrant history of unrest and revolution.

Thinadhoo was the wealthiest island in the country before it was forcefully depopulated and demolished entirely in 1962. The rich merchants of the island were known to have assisted even the capital when in need.

== City status ==
On 30 August 2023, President Ibrahim Mohamed Solih formally announced Thinadhoo Island in Gaafu Dhaal Atoll as a city, utilizing the authority granted to him by Section 51 (a) of the Maldives' Decentralisation Act (Law number 7/2010).

The decision was made because of the island's significant population and its crucial role in delivering a diverse range of services to the inhabitants of the atolls.

A case was originally filed in the High Court to revoke Thinadhoo's city status after it was revealed that the Thinadhoo City Council submitted a fraudulent list in order to gain city status. The issue was also raised in parliament following a letter submitted by Thinadhoo MP Saudulla Hilmy. The High Court later dismissed it, citing no jurisdiction, which led to the dispute being redirected to the Civil Court.

== History ==
=== Early history ===
Written history of the island is sparse.

=== Havaru Thinadhoo ===
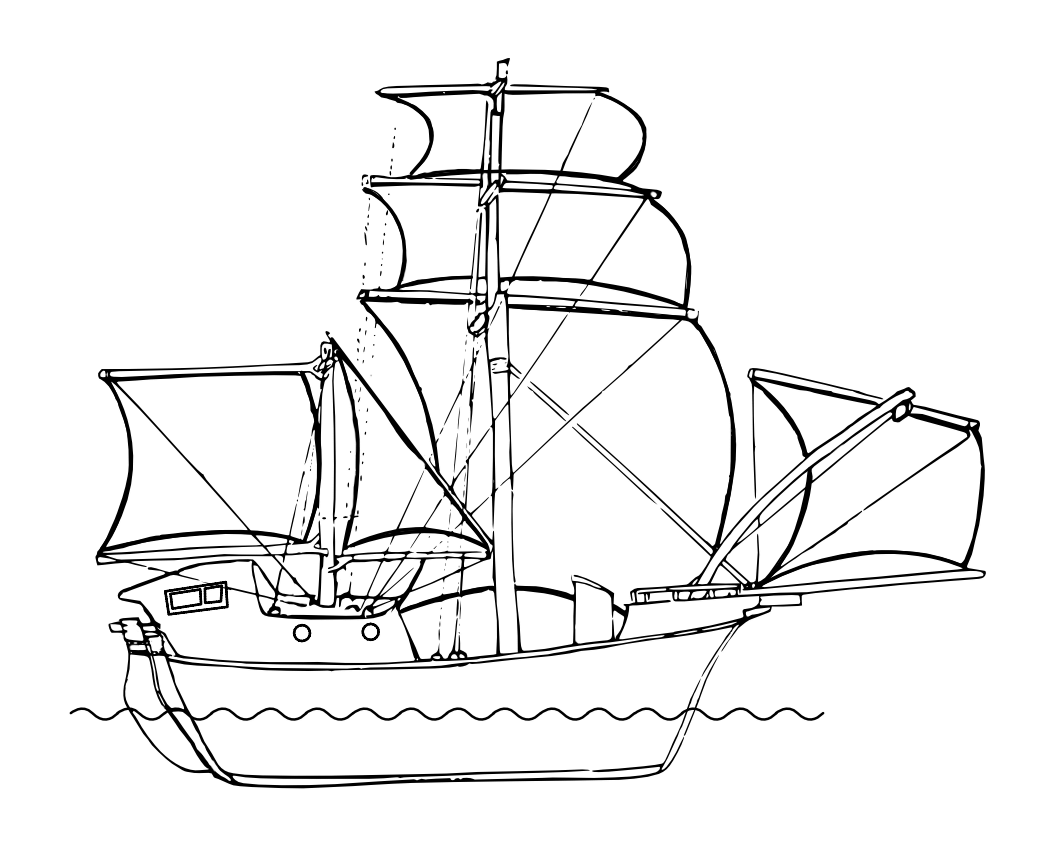
Long distance 100 to 200 dead-weight tonnage odi (ship) of Huvadu design type from the Southern Atolls. The Odis were built in the Southern Atolls and operational until 1960s. Havaru Thinadhoo had 40 odis before they were discontinued and they were famous throughout the Indian Ocean. Fully decked with deck-houses and large overhanging forecastle. Three-mast arrangement at the rig. A large main square-sail set atop a tall mainmast. Fore-and-aft gaff-sail set from the mizzen. Raking foremast carrying a square foresail well out over the bows.

The Havaru, also known as the military factions, were sent to Thinadhoo during the time of Bodu Thakurufaanu.

When 'havaru' were given these six regions they leased them to the people of Thinadhoo under the Vaaru system. Each year Thinadhoo people were to send the annual Varuvaa (Tax) to the 'Havaru' based in Male'. This practice lasted until the sultanate of Muhammad Mueenuddeen I.

In addition to Thinadhoo there were 3 other islands undertaken by the Havaru. They were Kaadedhoo, Kannigili Kolhu and Kubbudu in Huvadhoo Atoll.

During the time of Havaru, the island of Thinadhoo used Kaadedhoo for farming.

=== Annual varuvaa or tax ===
The annual varuvaa (tax) sent to the Huvaru in Male' from Thinadhoo included:

- 300 Boduvattey Bondi (a local type of dish)
- 1200 Kuduvatti (a local type of dish)
- 1200 Kaadeddhoo Kuna (local woven mat)
- 1 Hulhevi Kuna (local mat) from each household.
- 16 Wood blocks
- 1 Bokkura (a small local boat)
- 2 teaspoon of coconut oil from each person in Thinadhoo
- 1 Boikotte Boli (a type of shell) from each person in Thinadhoo

=== Ha Varu (Havaru or Six militia divisions) ===
The Ha Varu were organized as two ranks of three divisions each:

Is Thin Varu (Lead rank with three divisions)

- Dhoshimeynaa Varu
- Velaanaa Varu
- Hakuraa Varu

Fas Thin Varu (Rear rank with three divisions)

- Maafaiy Varu
- Dhaharaa Varu
- Faamuladheyri Varu.

Muhammad Thakurufaanu Al Auzam offered havaru the island of Thinadhoo, He ordered that the 'dhandu kolhu', 'medhu ruganddu' and 'Baraaseel' to be given to Havaru along with the islands of Thinadhoo Maahuttaa, Kaadedhdhoo and Kuddu. The island itself was renamed Havaru Thinadhoo signifying the occupation.

== United Suvadive Republic ==
Havaru Thinadhoo was the economic hub of the United Suvadive Republic, an unrecognised breakaway nation from Maldives.

=== Depopulation of Havaru Thinadhoo ===
On 4 February 1962 the Kingdom of Maldives reacted by sending a fully armed gunboat to Havaru Thinadhoo commanded by Prime Minister Ibrahim Nasir.

== Enamaa boat incident ==
The Maldive boat Enamaa was carrying far more than its capacity of up to 126 when a wave overturned it. Twenty one people died with two missing when Enamaa capsized into the sea of Gaafu Dhaalu atoll on 17 March 2004.

== Geography ==
The island is 407.06 km (253 mi; 220 nmi) south of the country's capital, Malé.

=== Climate ===
Thinadhoo has a tropical rainforest climate (Köppen: Af).

Climate data for Thinadhoo
Month	Jan	Feb	Mar	Apr	May	Jun	Jul	Aug	Sep	Oct	Nov	Dec	Year
Mean daily maximum °C (°F)	27.7 (81.9)	28.0 (82.4)	28.4 (83.1)	28.7 (83.7)	28.6 (83.5)	28.5 (83.3)	28.1 (82.6)	28.0 (82.4)	28.0 (82.4)	27.9 (82.2)	27.7 (81.9)	27.5 (81.5)	28.1 (82.6)
Daily mean °C (°F)	27.1 (80.8)	27.4 (81.3)	27.8 (82.0)	28.0 (82.4)	27.9 (82.2)	27.8 (82.0)	27.5 (81.5)	27.3 (81.1)	27.3 (81.1)	27.1 (80.8)	27.0 (80.6)	26.9 (80.4)	27.4 (81.4)
Mean daily minimum °C (°F)	26.4 (79.5)	26.7 (80.1)	27.0 (80.6)	27.0 (80.6)	27.0 (80.6)	26.9 (80.4)	26.5 (79.7)	26.5 (79.7)	26.4 (79.5)	26.2 (79.2)	26.1 (79.0)	26.1 (79.0)	26.6 (79.8)
Average precipitation mm (inches)	109.9 (4.33)	72.3 (2.85)	76.7 (3.02)	149.9 (5.90)	213.4 (8.40)	105.6 (4.16)	145.2 (5.72)	134.6 (5.30)	163.9 (6.45)	214.1 (8.43)	225.4 (8.87)	206.0 (8.11)	1,817 (71.54)
Source: Weather.Directory

== Demography ==
Historical population
Year	Pop.	±%
1959	6,000	—
1966	1,800	−70.0%
2006	4,442	+146.8%
2014	4,669	+5.1%
2022	6,217	+33.2%
2006–2022: Census populations Source: 1959: The Maldives: New Stresses in an Old Nation 1966: Siyaasee thaareekhu – Thinadhoo 2022: National Census populations

== Education ==
Thinadhoo has 4 pre-schools, 2 primary schools, 1 secondary/high-school and 3 college or university campuses including Maldives National University Thinadhoo Campus and Avid College

== Transport ==
Kaadedhdhoo Domestic Airport is situated on a nearby island connected by speed boat which can be reached to Thinadhoo in 5–10 minutes.

== See also ==
- United Suvadive Republic
- Upper South Province
- Huvadhu Atoll
