= Maldivian nationality law =

Maldivian Citizenship Act

People's Majlis
- Long title: An Act relating to Maldivian citizenship
- Enacted by: Government of Maldives
- Status: Current legislation

Maldivian nationality law is contained in the provisions of the Maldivian Citizenship Act and in the relevant provisions of the Constitution of the Maldives. A person may be a citizen of the Republic of the Maldives through birth, descent, adoption or naturalisation.

== Acquisition of citizenship ==
=== At birth ===
Birth in the Republic of the Maldives does not automatically confer to citizenship unless

- The child is found abandoned with no knowledge of the whereabouts of the parents.

=== By descent ===
A person is a Maldivian citizen by descent if, at the time of his or her birth, at least one of his or her parents was a Maldivian citizen. The place of that person's birth is not a deciding factor.

=== By adoption ===
All adoptions performed or recognised under Maldivian law confer Maldivian citizenship on the adopted child (if not already a Maldivian citizen) if at least one of the adopters was a Maldivian citizen at the time of the adoption.

=== By naturalisation ===
Any person, who wishes to become a citizen of Maldives, shall submit a written application to the Ministry of Foreign Affairs, provided they fulfill the following conditions;

- They are Muslim
- They have attained the age of 21 and is of sound mind
- They have resided in the Maldives for a continuous period of 12 years. They shall be deemed to have complied with the said requirement if they have resided abroad, provided that the period is not more than 6 months, and has resided in the Maldives for a period amounting in the aggregate to more than 10 years.
- They have an adequate knowledge with regard to the Maldivian Constitution.
- They can write and speak in the Dhivehi language.
- If they are a citizen of any country other than Maldives, provided he has renounced the citizenship of that country in accordance with the law therein force in that behalf and has officially notified in writing such renunciation to the Government of Maldives.

The president of the Maldives may, at his discretion, grant the citizenship to any person, who makes or has made an application for Maldivian citizenship, subject to his qualification of the provisions of this Act.

== Loss of citizenship ==
=== By renunciation ===
Voluntary renunciation of Maldivian citizenship is permitted by law. Final permission must be granted by the President of the Maldives.

=== Involuntary ===
There are no provisions for the involuntary loss of Maldivian citizenship. Persons who acquire a new citizenship should not assume that they have lost their Maldivian citizenship by default.

== Dual citizenship ==
Dual citizenship is recognised in the Maldives and any Maldivian citizen acquiring another country's citizenship will not lose their original citizenship in the Maldives. Maldivian citizens who obtain citizenship of another nation are not required to register, justify or renounce their Maldivian citizenship.

== Commonwealth citizenship ==
Maldivians are also Commonwealth citizens.

== Travel freedom of Maldivian citizens ==
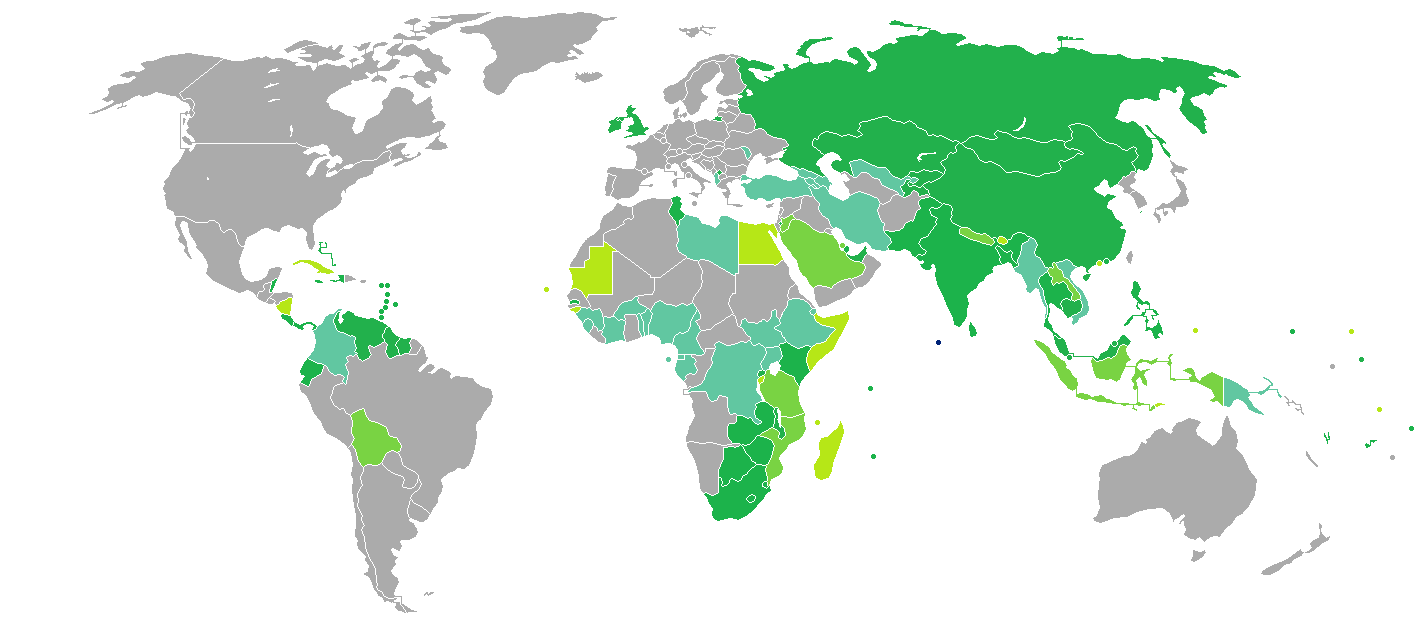
Visa requirements for Maldivian citizens holding ordinary passports Maldives Visa free access Visa on arrival eVisa Visa available both on arrival or online Visa required
