= Gan (Huvadhu Atoll) =

- Uninhabited island
- Location in Maldives
- Coordinates: 00°16′38″N 73°25′58″E
- Country: Maldives
- Administrative atoll: Gaafu Dhaalu Atoll
- Distance to Malé: 438 km (272 mi)

Population
  - Total: 0
- Time zone: UTC+05:00 (MST)

Gan is one of the uninhabited islands of Southern Huvadhu Atoll, in the Gaafu Dhaalu Atoll administrative division of the Maldives and is the largest natural island in Huvadhu Atoll.

Gan Island was formerly inhabited, but its inhabitants moved to neighboring islands after a severe epidemic at the end of the 18th century. Before that point, there is evidence of continuous human habitation since very ancient times. There are still large cultivated fields of yams, manioc and coconut trees on this island, which are used by neighboring islanders from Gadhdhoo

The origin of the word "Gan" is in the Sanskrit word "Grama", meaning "village". This island should not be confused with other Maldive islands called "Gan" in Addu Atoll and Haddummati Atoll.

== Archaeology ==
There are several ancient Buddhist ruins on this island, including one of the largest stupas in the Maldives:

- A large ruin called “Gamu Haviththa” located at the centre of the island is 73 m in circumference and 18 m in height. Local tradition says it was a Buddhist place of worship.
- Another mound 55 m in circumference and 1.5 m in height is situated on the western shore of the island.
- Another mound with a circumference of 15 m and a height of 1 m is on the northwestern shore of the island.
- Another mound with a circumference of 58 m and a height of 9 m is on the southeastern shore of the island.
- On the northwest of the centre of the island is a mound with a circumference of 42 m and a height of 6 m.
- There is another mound near the latter with a circumference of 37 m and a height of 3 m.

Thor Heyerdahl visited this island and investigated one of the ruined stupas there in the 1980s accompanied by Mohamed Lutfi. This included the foundation of the perimeter of the vihara or temple compound. However, most ruins have not yet been well researched. A folklore talks about the island becoming inhabited with the arrival of some majestic beasts.
