= Gaafu Dhaalu Atoll =

Administrative district of the Maldives

Coordinates: 0°25′N 73°10′E

- atoll of the Maldives
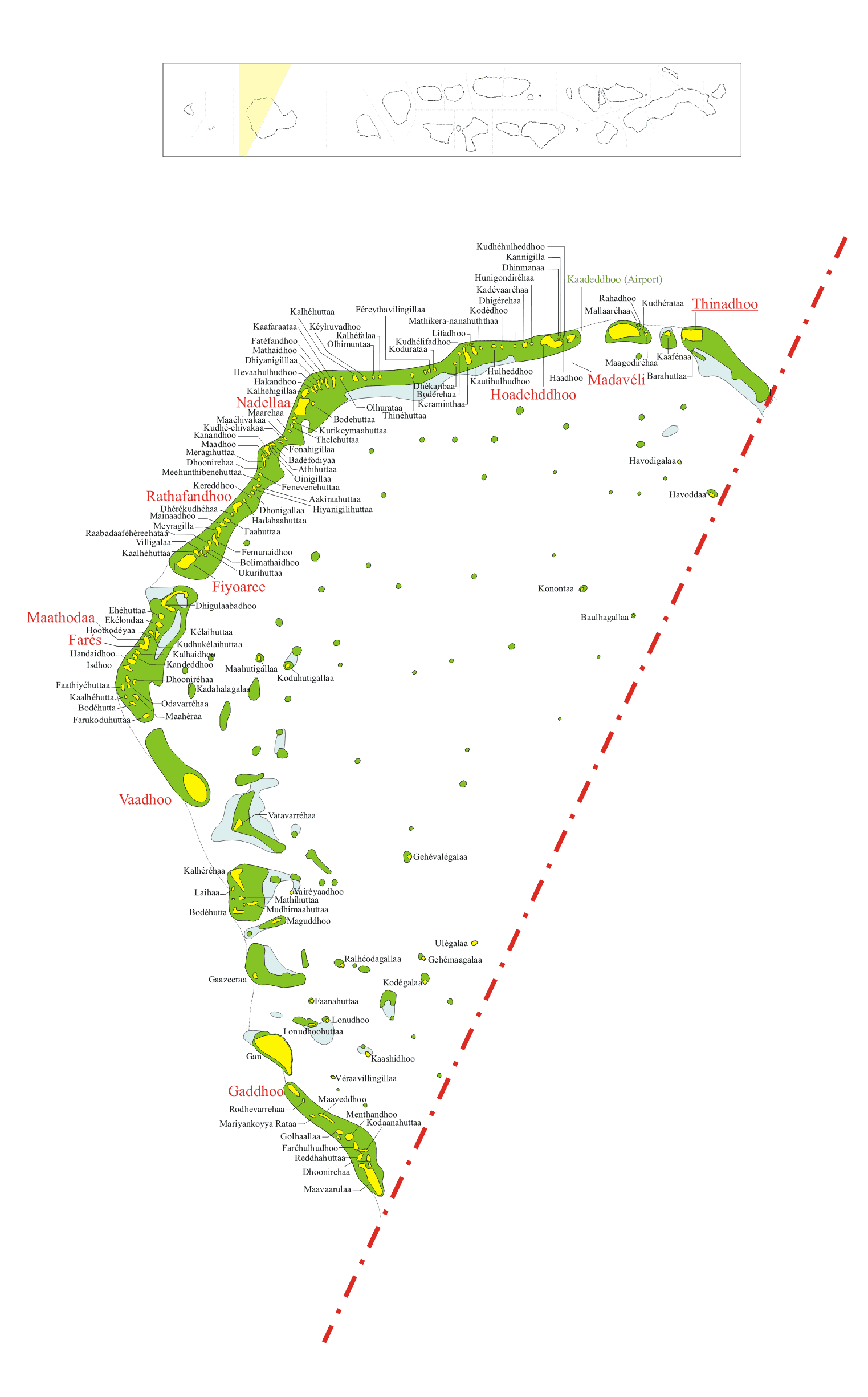

- Location of Gaafu Dhaalu in Maldives
- Country: Maldive
- Corresponding geographic atoll(s): Huvadhu Atholhu Dhekunuburi
- Location: 0° 28' N and 0° 10' N
- Capital: Thinadhoo

Population
  - Total: 11,587
- Letter code: Q
- Dhivehi letter code: GDh (ގދ)
  - Number of islands: 153
  - Inhabited islands: Fares-Maathodaa * Fiyoari * Gaddhoo * Hoandeddhoo * Madaveli * Nadellaa * Rathafandhoo * Vaadhoo * Thinadhoo
  - Uninhabited islands: Aakiraahuttaa, Athihuttaa, Badéfodiyaa, Barahuttaa, Baulhagallaa, Bodehuttaa, Bodérehaa, Bolimathaidhoo, Dhékanbaa, Dhérékudhéhaa, Dhigérehaa, Dhigulaabadhoo, Dhinmanaa, Dhiyanigilllaa, Dhonigallaa, Dhoonirehaa, Ehéhuttaa, Ekélondaa, Faahuttaa, Faanahuttaa, Faathiyéhuttaa, Faréhulhudhoo, Farukoduhuttaa, Fatéfandhoo, Femunaidhoo, Fenevenehuttaa, Féreythavilingillaa, Fonahigillaa, Gaazeeraa, Gan (Huvadhu Atoll)
- Resort islands(*), airports(¤) and industrial islands are also considered uninhabited.

Gaafu Dhaalu (also known as Southern Huvadhu Atoll or Huvadhu Atholhu Dhekunuburi, ހުވަދުއަތޮޅު ދެކުނުބުރި) is an administrative district of the Maldives formed by the southwestern section of Huvadhu Atoll. It was created on February 8, 1962, when Huvadhu Atoll was divided into two districts. Gaafu Dhaalu corresponds to the Southwestern section of this large natural atoll, south of the line extending between the channels of Footukandu and Vaarulu Kandu. The capital of this region is Thinadhoo (Thenadhoo). There are 153 islands in this district, 10 of which are inhabited. This district is located about 340 kilometers south of the capital Malé.

Haa Alifu, Haa Dhaalu, Shaviyani, Noonu, Raa, Baa, Kaafu, etc. (including Gaafu Dhaalu) are code letters assigned to the present administrative divisions of the Maldives. They are not the proper names of the natural atolls that make up these divisions. Some atolls are divided into two administrative divisions while other divisions are made up of two or more natural atolls. The order followed by the code letters is from North to South, beginning with the first letters of the Thaana alphabet used in Dhivehi. These code letters are not accurate from the geographical and cultural point of view. However, they have become popular among tourists and foreigners in the Maldives who find them easier to pronounce than the true atoll names in Dhivehi, (save a few exceptions, like Ari Atoll).

== History ==
Historically the Huvadhu Atoll chief had a great measure of self-government. He even had the privilege, not granted to any other atoll chief of the Maldives, to fly his own flag in his vessels and at his residence.

In January 1959, the three southern atolls: Huvadhu, Fuvahmulah and Addu, were involved in setting up the breakaway United Suvadive Republic which survived until September 1963. The name of the secessionist state was taken from the ancient name of this atoll. In some islands, like Gaddhū, there was opposition to the secession, and by means of threats and arson, the groups of people opposing the Suvadive state were forced to agree. Havaru Thinadhoo was burnt down by soldiers sent by then Prime Minister Ibrahim Nasir from Malé during the secession in 1962, after which it was left uninhabited for four whole years.

The Kaadedhdhoo Domestic Airport, located on the formerly uninhabited island of Kaadedhdhoo was opened in 1993.

In 2006 the Tourism Ministry of Maldives released the island of Vatavarrehaa for tourist resort development. A 150-bed resort is planned, this is the first resort to be built in Gaafu Dhaalu Atoll.

== Geography and climate ==
Gaafu Dhaalu has a tropical rainforest climate (Köppen: Af) with heavy rainfall year-round.

Climate data for Kaadedhdhoo Airport, (elevation 0.61 m (2.0 ft), 1991−2020 normals)
Month	Jan	Feb	Mar	Apr	May	Jun	Jul	Aug	Sep	Oct	Nov	Dec	Year
Mean daily maximum °C (°F)	30.6 (87.1)	31.0 (87.8)	31.5 (88.7)	31.7 (89.1)	31.4 (88.5)	31.3 (88.3)	31.0 (87.8)	30.9 (87.6)	30.7 (87.3)	30.7 (87.3)	30.6 (87.1)	30.4 (86.7)	31.0 (87.8)
Daily mean °C (°F)	28.4 (83.1)	28.7 (83.7)	29.0 (84.2)	29.2 (84.6)	29.0 (84.2)	28.9 (84.0)	28.6 (83.5)	28.4 (83.1)	28.3 (82.9)	28.3 (82.9)	28.1 (82.6)	28.1 (82.6)	28.6 (83.5)
Mean daily minimum °C (°F)	25.1 (77.2)	25.2 (77.4)	25.1 (77.2)	25.3 (77.5)	25.3 (77.5)	25.1 (77.2)	24.7 (76.5)	24.5 (76.1)	24.6 (76.3)	24.5 (76.1)	24.5 (76.1)	24.5 (76.1)	24.9 (76.8)
Average precipitation mm (inches)	157.9 (6.22)	78.7 (3.10)	77.9 (3.07)	155.7 (6.13)	265.1 (10.44)	155.9 (6.14)	166.7 (6.56)	203.8 (8.02)	228.9 (9.01)	248.7 (9.79)	274.4 (10.80)	258.6 (10.18)	2,272.3 (89.46)
Average precipitation days (≥ 0.1 mm)	8.6	5.2	5.8	11.4	14.5	10.3	11.1	12.2	13.3	16.3	15.6	14.4	138.7
Source: NOAA

== Archaeology ==
There are important Buddhist archaeological remains on the islands of Fiyoaree, Gan, Vādū and others. These ruins consist mainly of large ruined stupas. The stupa in Gan was partially explored by Thor Heyerdahl's archaeologists in recent test-excavations. However, all other ruins have not been well researched yet.
