= Huvadhu Kandu =

Geography of Maldives

Coordinates: 1°30′00″N 73°00′00″E

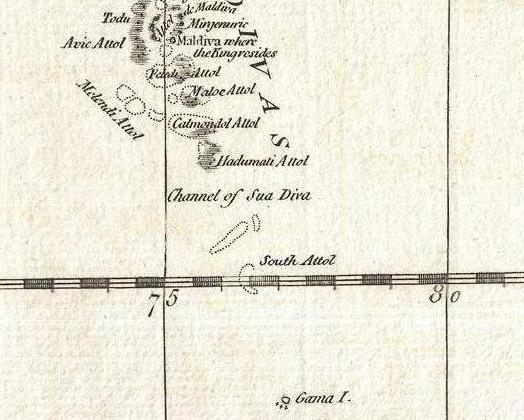
Suvadiva Channel in 1784 D'Anville map

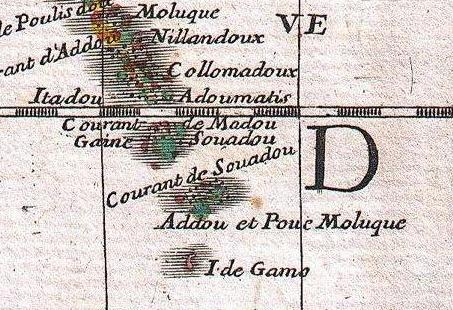
Courant de Souadou on 1687 Sanson map

Suvadiva Channel (Dv: Huvadu Kandu) is the broad channel that separates the northern and central Maldives from the southern atolls.

Sperm whales are a common sight on the surface of the Suvadiva Channel.

Maldives One and Half Degree Huvadhoo Channel tides for fishing.https://tideking.com/Maldives/Other/One-and-Half-Degree-Channel/Fishing/

== Geography ==
This channel lies between Haddhunmathi Atoll and Huvadhu Atoll and it is the broadest channel between any other atoll of Maldives.

In the British Admiralty charts it is called One and a Half Degree Channel. On old French maps it appeared as Courant de Souadou.

Roughly in the middle of the broad Huvadu channel there is a small bank known as Medutila (also called Derahaa). This place is the peak of a submarine mountain, and perhaps an atoll in the process of formation. This submerged bank is very difficult to spot for at its shallowest point there is a depth of 6 fathoms (11 m). It looks like a paler blue patch surrounded by huge expanses of the deepest ocean. There, no island can be seen in the horizon for many dozens of miles.

== See also ==
- Atolls of the Maldives
