= Huvadhu Atoll =

Atoll in the Indian Ocean

Coordinates: 0°30′N 73°18′E

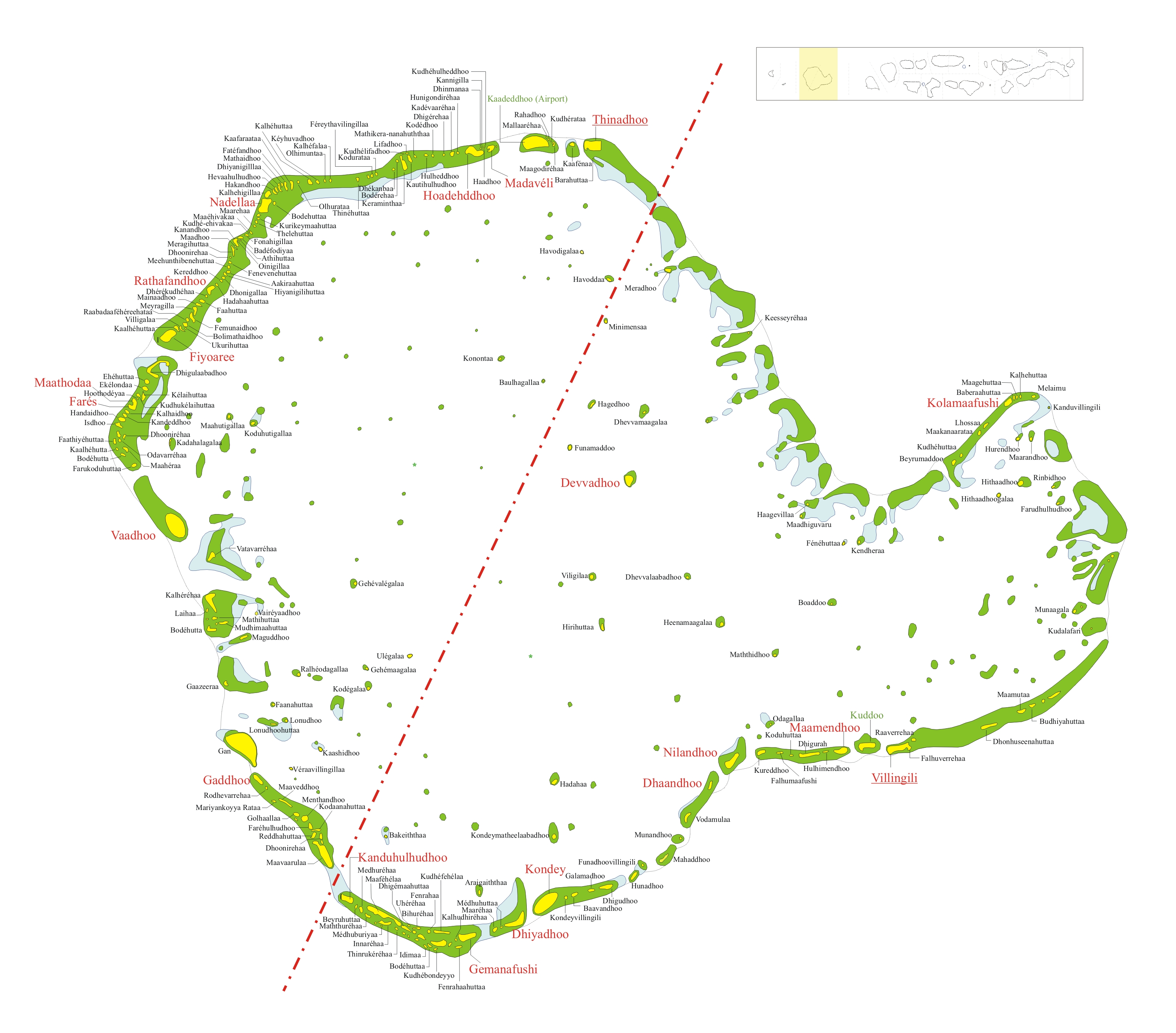
Huvadhoo Atoll is divided into two administrative atolls, Gaafu Alif and Gaafu Dhaalu

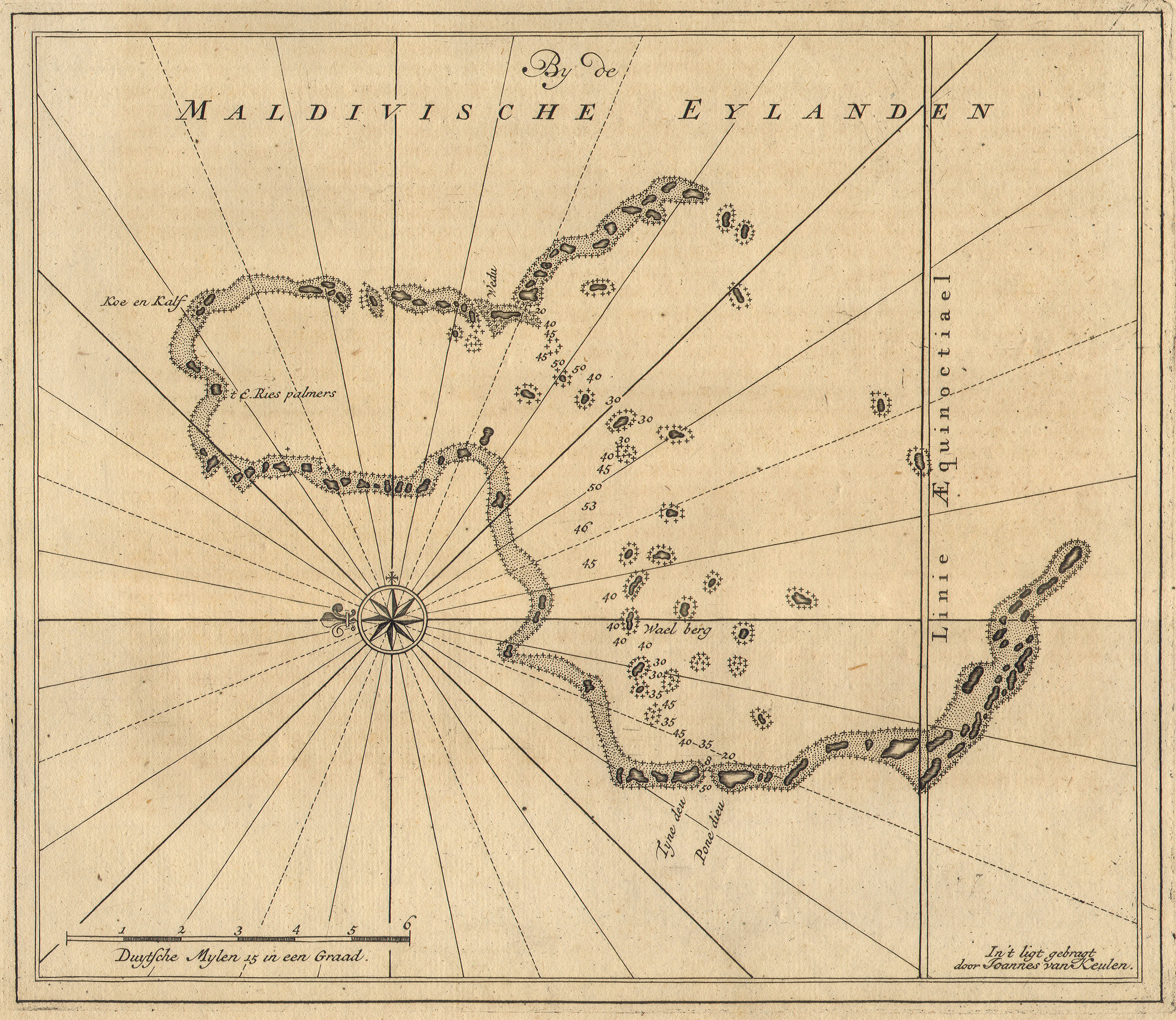
1753 Van Keulen Map of Huvadu Atoll (inaccurate)

Huvadhu, Suvadive, Suvaidu or Suvadiva is the atoll with the most islands in the world. The atoll is located in the Indian Ocean. It is south of the Suvadiva Channel in the Republic of Maldives with a total area of 3,152 km^{2}, of which 38.5 km^{2} is dry land. The atoll contains 255 islands.

It is the second largest atoll in the country, after Boduthiladhunmathi (consisting of Haa Alif, Haa Dhaalu, Shaviyani, and Noonu administrative divisions) which has smaller and fewer islands spread across a larger area.

Huvadu Atoll has been divided into two districts (administrative provinces) for administrative purposes since the 1970s. These divisions are Northern Huvadhu Atoll (Gaafu Alifu) in the north, and Southern Huvadhu Atoll (Gaafu Dhaalu).

During his journey to the Maldives, 14th century Muslim explorer Ibn Batuta stated in his journal that the Maldives was destitute of grain, except in the province of Souweid (Suvadiva or Huvadu) where they produced a cereal, a kind of Millet which was brought to Mahal.

The traditional seat of power in the Huvadhu was Thinadhoo until the division, after which Thinadhoo remained the Capital of South Huvadhu Atoll, and Villingili was instated as the capital of North Huvadhu Atoll.

The master carpenters of the iconic Male' Hukuru Miskiy were from Huvadu, Kondey island. They were Ali Maavadi Kaleyfaanu and Mahmud Maavadi Kaleyfaanu.

The best quality mats of the Maldives are woven in this atoll, in the island of Gaddū. The local grass 'hau' is dyed in two colors, black and yellow.

== Guinness World Record ==
Huvadhu Atoll, located in the Maldives within the Indian Ocean, spans approximately 2,900 square kilometers (1,120 square miles) and encompasses around 255 islands within its confines. It holds the Guinness World Record for the atoll with the most number of islands in the World.

== History ==
Merchant flag of Huvadhu Atoll Chief

The ancient Sanskritised name of this atoll was Suvadive. Its capital is Thinadhoo (Huvadhu Atoll)

Historically the Huvadu atoll chief based in Thinadhoo had a great measure of self-government. He even had the privilege, not granted to any other atoll chief of the Maldives, to fly his own flag in his vessels and at his residence. The flag of the Huvadu Atoll Chief was similar to the flag of Nepal in cut, with two central black triangles edged by red and white bands.

There are many Buddhist archaeological remains in Huvadū. Therefore, it is likely that this was an important atoll in Maldivian history. None of these ancient remains have been properly investigated as yet.

Due to its strategic placement on the main sea route around southern India, Huvadhu and the other southern atolls have a long history of contact from mariners sailing the Indian Ocean through the centuries.

=== Descendants of the three dynasties: Devvadhoo, Diyamigili & Isdhoo ===
Families of Devvadhoo, Dhiyamigili and Isdhoo Dynasty can be traced to Devvadu, Addu, Fuvahmulah and Tinadu. After the assassination of Muhammed Ghiya'as ud-din, Prince Abdulla son of Ghiyaasuddin was banished to Fuvahmulah. The South of Maldives was a safe haven for Abdulla being a descendant of Addu Bodu Fandiyaaru Thakurufaan.

=== Sultan Mohamed IV (Devvadhoo Rasgefaanu) ===
Dhevvadhoo island is located at the centre of the Huvadu atoll. Sultan Mohamed IV or Devvadhoo Rasgefaanu was the first Sultan of Devvadhoo Dynasty who was the son of Ali Mafahaiy Kilege of Devvadu and Kakuni Dio. Sultan Mohamed IV was married to Khadheeja Kan’ba, daughter of Ibrahim Shah Bandar also known as Isdhoo Bodu Velaanaa Thakurufaan. After his death the Isdhoo dynasty was proclaimed.

=== Secession of the United Suvadive Republic ===
In January 1959, the three southern atolls: Huvadhu, Fuvahmulah and Addu, were involved in setting up the breakaway United Suvadive Republic which survived until September 1963. The name of the secessionist state was taken from the ancient name of Huvadhoo atoll.

In some islands, like Gaddhoo, there was opposition to the secession, however through threats and coercion, the groups of people opposing the Suvadive state were forced to agree.

The republic collapsed when the island of Havaru Thinadhoo was depopulated, and all infrastructure burnt to the ground by the Maldivian military led by then Prime Minister Ibrahim Nasir in 1962, after which it was left uninhabited for four years. For the next 10 years, the seat of power was moved to Gaddhoo until Havaru Thinadhoo, since repopulated, was reinstated as the capital of Huvadhoo.

The main motivation for secession was stated to be disagreements with the centralized policies that were being enforced by Male' at the time.

== Huvadu Kandu ==
The name of the broad channel north of this atoll is locally known as Huvadu Kandu. It appeared on the old French maps as Courant de Souadou. Other names are Suvadiva Channel or One-a-half Degree Channel.

It is named after Huvadu Atoll and is the broadest channel between the atolls of Maldives.

== Language ==
The inhabitants of this large atoll speak their own distinct form of the Dhivehi language, known as Huvadu dialect (bahuruva).

Because of the isolation from the Northern Atolls, and the capital of Malé, the Huvadhu dialect is significantly different from the other variants of the Maldive language, making much use of the retroflex 'Ţ' and allegedly retaining old forms of Dhivehi.

== See also ==
- United Suvadive Republic
- List of sultans of the Maldives
- Isdhoo dynasty
- Dhiyamigili dynasty
- Atolls of the Maldives
- Saleem Ali
