= List of protected areas of Maldives =

This is a list of protected areas of the Maldives:

- Angafaru
- Hanifaru
- South Ari Atoll MPA
- Hithaadhoo (Baa Atoll)
- Olhugiri (Baa Atoll)
- Hurasdhoo
- Huraa Mangrove Area
- Eidhigali Kilhi and Koattey Area
- Fushee Kandu
- Filitheyo Kandu
- Lhazikuraadi
- Vattaru Kandu
- Faruhuruvalhibeyru
- Kashibeyru Thila
- Lankan Thila
- Kuredhu Kanduolhi
- Dhigali Haa
- Vilingili Thila
- Fushivaru Thila
- Miyaru Kandu
- Kudarah Thila
- Mushimasmigili Thila
- Orimas Thila
- Mayaa Thila
- Guraidhoo Kanduolhi
- Emboodhoo Kanduolhi
- Gulhifalhu Medhuga onna kohlavaanee
- Dhekunu Thilafalhuge Miyaruvani
- Kuda Haa
- Gaathugiri
- Thamburudhoo Thila
- Makunudhoo Kandu Olhi
- Rasfari island, lagoon and the surrounding reef
