= Tourism in the Maldives =

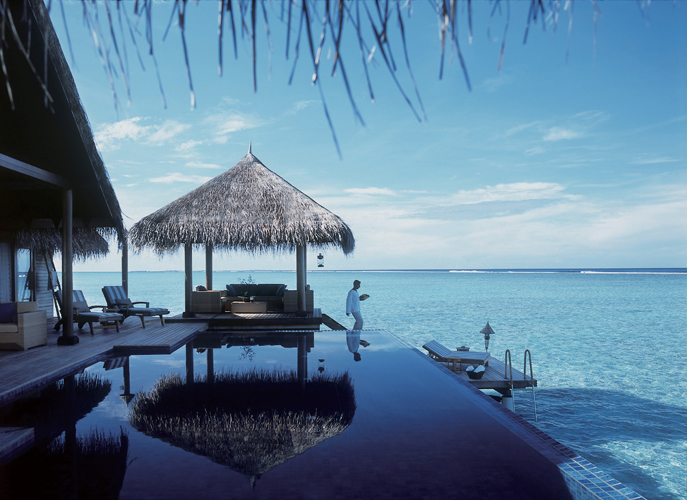
An island resort in the Maldives

Tourism is the largest economic industry in the Maldives, as it plays an important role in earning foreign exchange revenues and employs 25,000 people in the tertiary sector of the country. The archipelago of the Maldives is the main source of attraction to many tourists visiting the island country. Entrepreneurs have been swiftly amassing assets connected to the tourism sector in the Maldives. Given that tourism is the primary economic driver in the Maldives, this trend is affording the substantial influence over the nation's economy.

The tourism industry is especially vulnerable to climate change: as one of the island nations expected to be most impacted by climate change, sea level rise and subsequent increased extreme weather, coastal flooding, and coral bleaching damage the natural attractions that bring many of the tourists to the country.

== History ==
Emblem of the Republic of Maldives

President Ibrahim Nasir is credited for having started tourism in the Maldives in 1972 in order to diversify the economy and help in his vision of modernizing the Maldives. A United Nations mission on development which visited the Maldives Islands in the 1960s did not recommend tourism, claiming that the islands were not suitable. Ever since the launch of the first resort in Maldives in 1972, however, tourism in Maldives has flourished. The arrival of the first tourist's group is estimated to have occurred in February 1972. Tourism in Maldives started with just two resorts with a capacity of about 280 beds. Kurumba Island Resort is the first resort opened in Maldives, followed by Bandos Island Resort which was developed and opened by Ibrahim Nasir, Nasir also personally set up the first tourist agency known as "Crescent Tourist Agency". At present, there are over 132 resorts located in the different atolls constituting the Republic of Maldives. Over the decades, the number of tourists in Maldives is rising continuously. In 2009, local island guesthouses started popping up in the Maldives. This was thanks to a change in regulations that began to officially allow tourists to stay among the local population, rather than just on privately owned resort islands. In 2015, a total of 1.2 million tourists visited the Maldives, and another 1.5 million visited in 2016.

In 2018, the Maldives operated 130 island-resorts. Current work is being undertaken to boost tourism room capacity by constructing another 23 properties, which will include foreign developers such as the Waldorf Astoria, Mövenpick, Pullman and the Hard Rock Café Hotel. Extensive upgrades at the Velana International Airport will allow for 7.5 million visitors by early 2019 or 2020.

== Statistics ==
Yearly tourist arrivals in millions

=== Arrivals by country ===
Most visitors arriving to the Maldives on short term basis, were from the following countries of nationality:

Foreign tourist arrivals
Country	2019	2018	2017	2016	2015	2014	2013	2012	2011
China	284,029	283,116	306,530	324,326	359,514	363,626	331,719	229,550	198,655
India	166,030	90,474	83,019	66,955	52,368	45,587	38,014	31,721	30,978
Italy	136,343	105,297	88,848	71,202	65,616	57,862	57,854	62,782	83,328
Germany	131,561	117,532	112,109	106,381	105,132	98,328	93,598	98,351	90,517
United Kingdom	126,199	114,602	103,977	101,843	92,775	88,704	85,869	91,776	104,508
Russia	83,369	70,935	61,931	46,522	44,323	66,308	76,479	66,378	63,936
France	59,738	50,476	42,365	40,487	42,024	50,656	54,328	56,775	59,694
United States	54,474	42,901	39,180	32,589	29,308	25,641	20,034	16,049	14,490
Japan	44,251	42,304	41,133	39,894	39,244	38,817	39,463	36,438	35,782
Australia	39,928	37,254	27,360	N/A	N/A	N/A	N/A	N/A	N/A
Total	1,702,887	1,484,274	1,389,542	1,286,135	1,234,248	1,204,857	1,125,202	958,027	931,333

=== Tourism in the Maldives, 2020s ===
Tourists in the Maldives by nationality (2020–2023)
Rank	Nationality	2024	2023	2022	2021	2020
1	China	263,340	187,125	15,023	2,425	36,873
2	Russia	225,204	209,146	201,954	222,422	61,387
3	United Kingdom	181,644	155,994	179,311	62,777	52,720
4	Germany	157,246	135,091	133,432	95,358	36,435
5	Italy	145,672	118,525	97,627	27,309	46,690
6	India	130,805	209,193	241,382	291,787	62,960
7	United States	69,620	74,838	80,697	55,760	19,759
8	France	54,637	49,201	48,341	30,068	28,031
9	Spain	47,835	40,461	42,123	37,354	6,778
10	Switzerland	41,062	37,258	36,614	24,951	12,517
11	South Korea	36,395	36,324	35,948	6,849	5,895
12	Australia	35,818	33,684	25,094	4,077	7,220
13	Bangladesh	33,295	28,336	16,807	3,923	1,108
14	Poland	33,148	28,394	23,590	23,596	7,108
15	Japan	31,074	23,041	8,543	937	8,479
16	Saudi Arabia	29,735	29,963	32,384	40,014	7,578
17	Austria	29,425	24,930	25,056	17,128	8,103
18	Kazakhstan	27,575	20,833	21,430	24,024	6,470
19	Czech Republic	23,720	21,729	17,308	18,692	7,282
20	Romania	21,010	17,010	11,579	15,856	6,800
21	Malaysia	19,846	13,551	8,479	703	2,946
22	Thailand	18,410	17,998	15,988	839	3,468
23	Hungary	18,231	15,575	15,224	12,582	5,813
24	Turkey	18,064	14,016	10,502	10,529	3,164
25	United Arab Emirates	15,269	14,043	11,456	14,095	7,368
	Others	338,535	72,418	126,389	217,797	79,924
	Total	2,046,615	1,878,543	1,675,303	1,321,937	555,494

== Level of tourism development ==
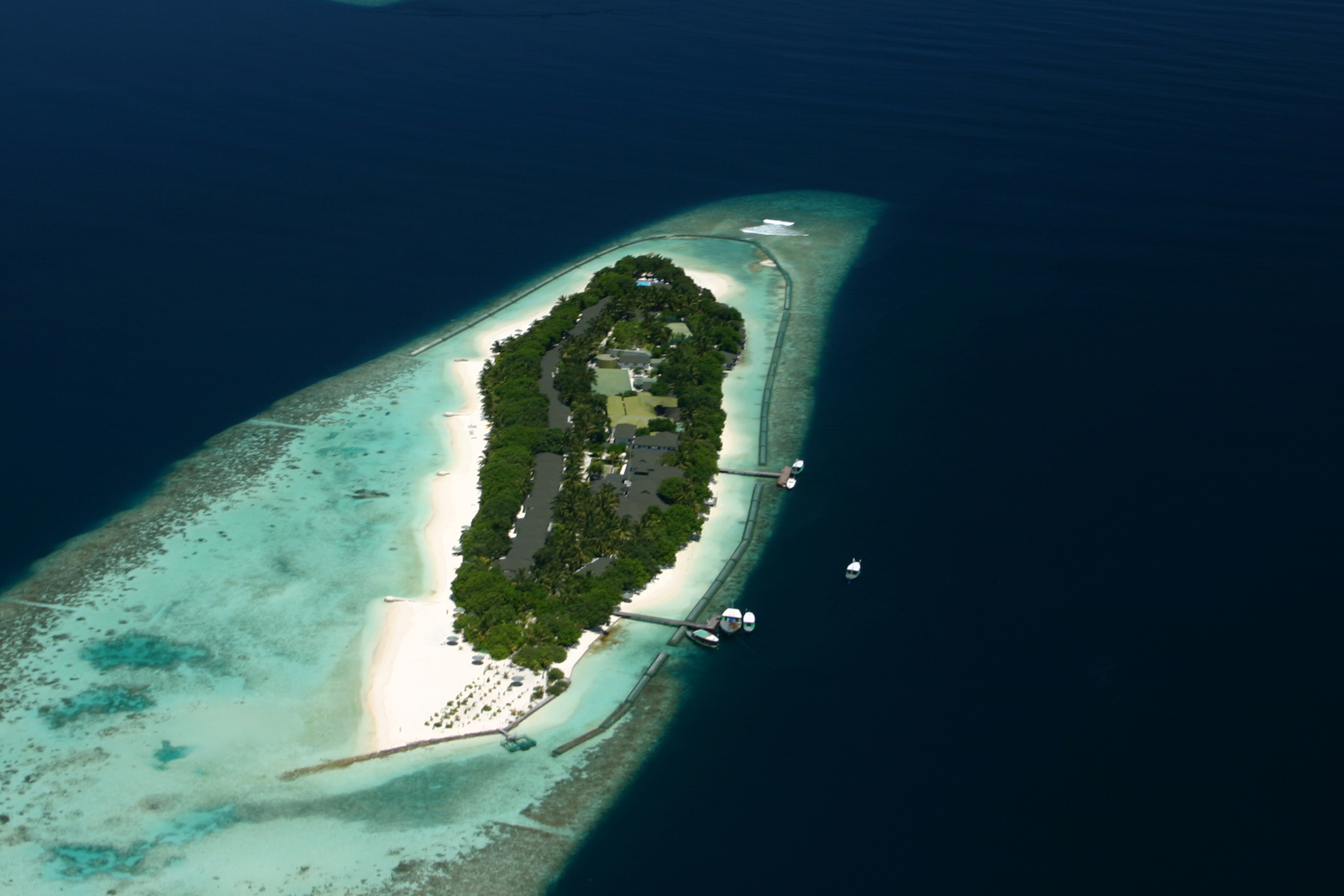
A Maldivian tourist resort

Tourism in the Maldives has started in 1972 with only two hotels, now – there are more than 100 operational resorts. The unique condition of Maldives is that one island is one resort, meaning that one hotel occupies the whole island. By doing so, resorts provide more privacy and more luxury for their visitors. The Maldives are also trying to stay eco-friendly and use more of solar energy rather than diesel. The Maldives provide facilities and services, entertainment and telecommunication services, they also provide numerous resorts, hotels, guest houses, and liveboards.

=== Overview of a typical tropical resort ===
A tourist resort in the Maldives typically consists of a hotel on its own island, with its population entirely made up of tourists and work force, with no local people or houses. China has established a presence in nearly every facet of the Maldivian government, tourism industry, and economy, spanning both the private and public sectors.

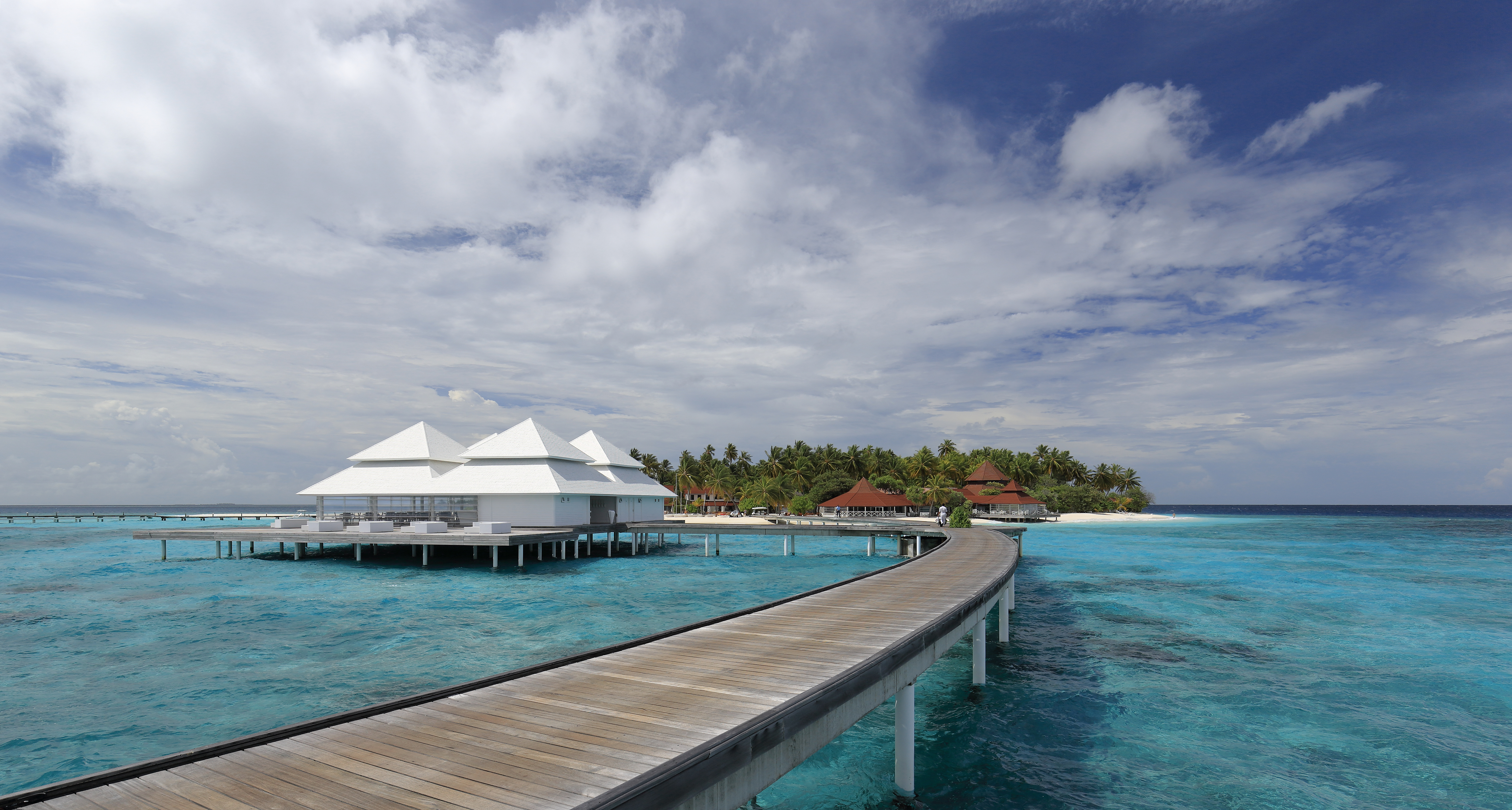
Diamonds Thudufushi Beach & Water Villas, a luxury resort on Thudufushi, Ari Atoll in May 2017

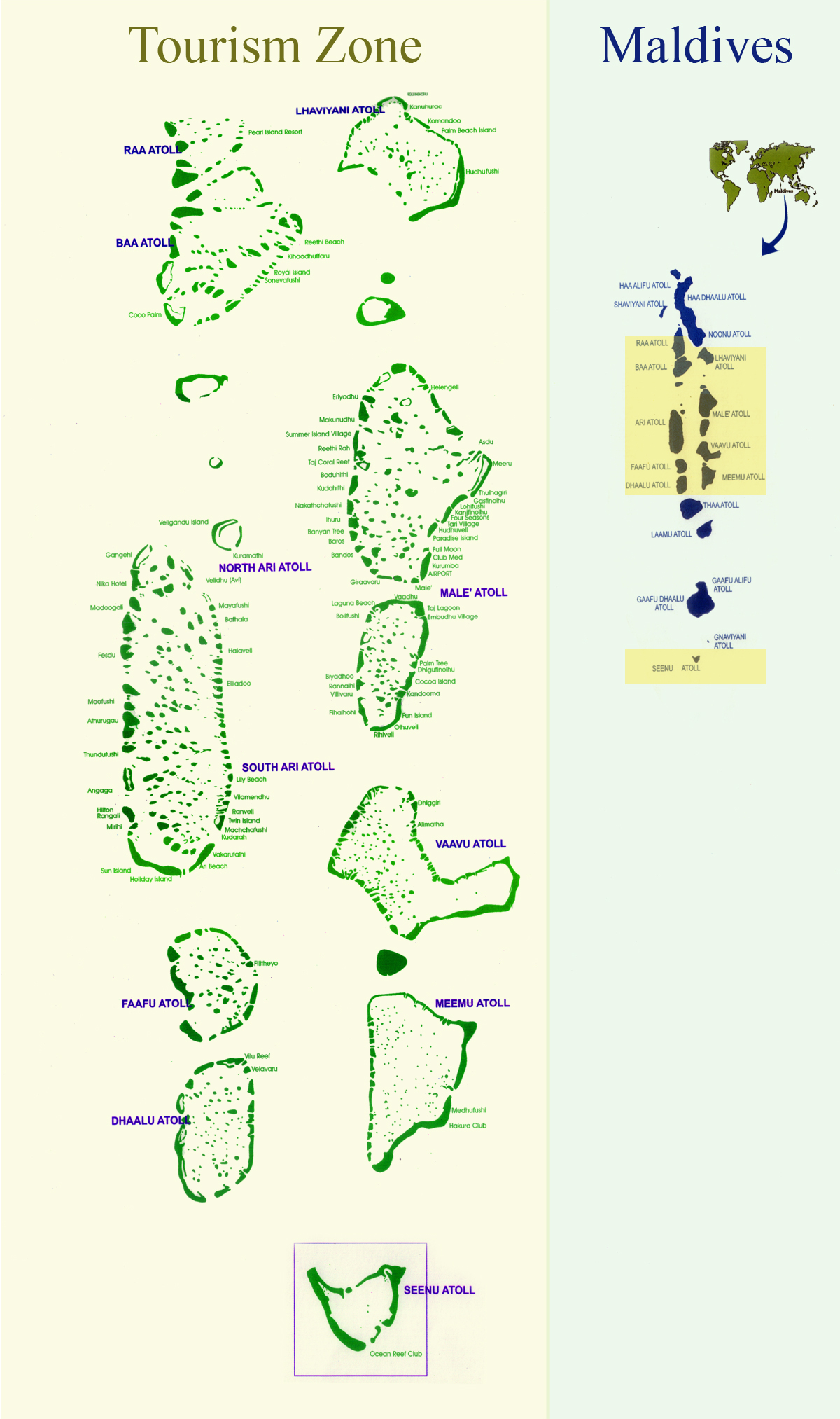
Tourism Zone

== Climate change ==
The Maldives' economy is greatly influenced by any climate changes. Tourism sector can be damaged by the increased likelihood of violent storms, damage to coral reefs, and beach erosion, which are now more likely to happen because of the rising seas.

As a consequence of climate change, Maldives is now facing the problem of rising seas and coral reefs bleaching. According to the World Bank, with "future sea levels projected to increase in the range of 10 to 100 centimeters by the year 2100, the entire country could be submerged." New government has made a decision to fight the rising seas problem with geoengineering projects instead of trying to move the population. The idea is to rent out other islands and even build new islands, so the population of those islands who are more in trouble could be relocated. One of those built islands is Hulhumale'.

It has been also pointed out that some islands can grow naturally.

World Bank states that, "Rising sea temperatures also threaten the coral reefs and cause bleaching and death, with the most severe damage in areas that are stressed by pollutants, or damaged by physical disturbance. Vulnerability to climate change hazards has been magnified by damage to coral reefs which has in turn impaired their protective function, thus a negative cycle of impact."

== Health concerns ==
On 24 May 2021, Maldives had the world's fastest-growing COVID-19 outbreak, with the highest number of infections per thousand people over the prior 7 and 14 days, according to data compiled by Bloomberg. Doctors warned that increasing demand for COVID-19 care could hinder their ability to handle other health emergencies in the Maldives.

== Environmental concerns ==
=== Ecotourism ===
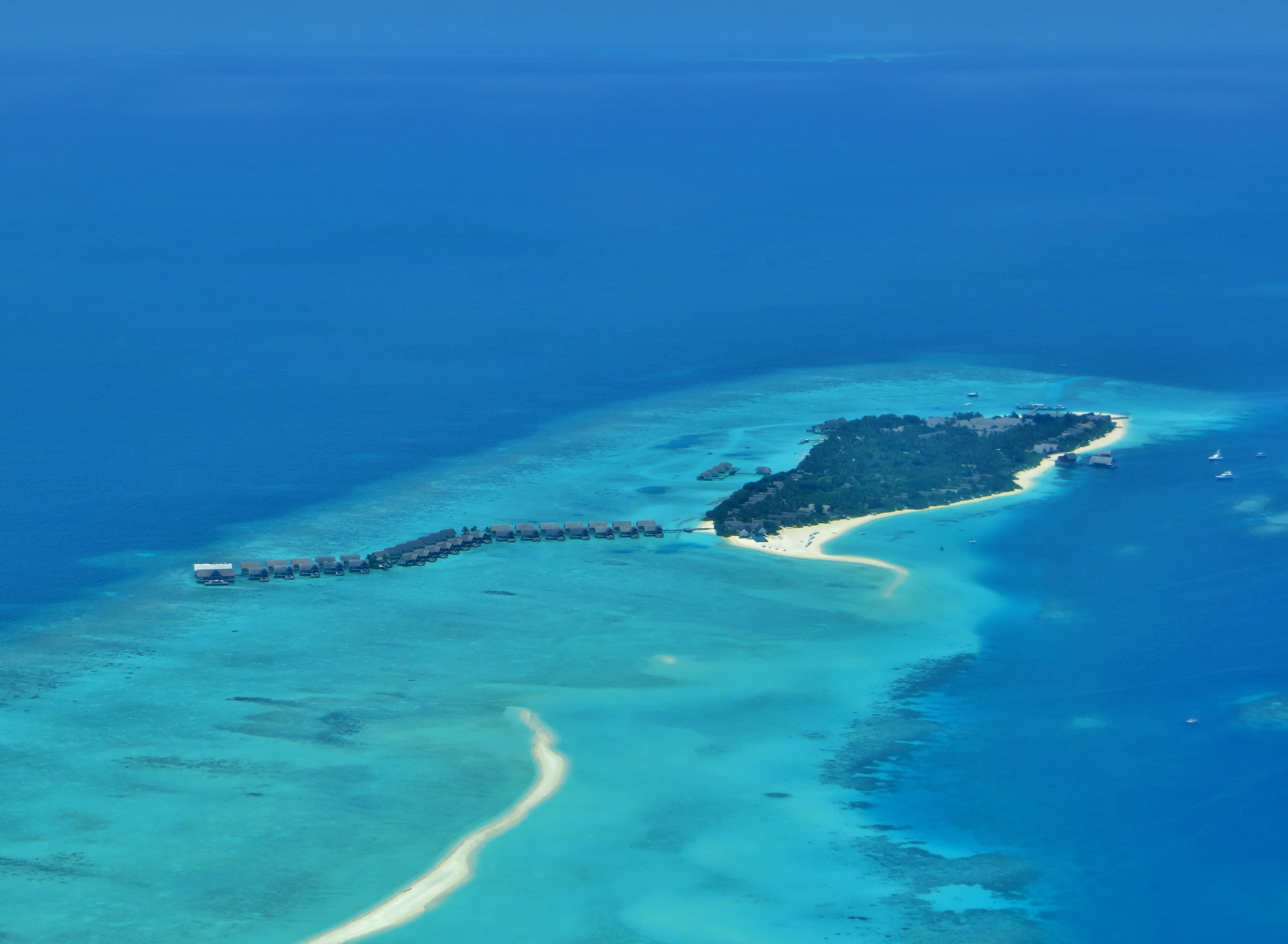
The resort island of Landaa Giraavaru (Maldives).

There is some promotion of ecotourism in the Maldives, with resorts emphasizing recycling of heat that is wasted in producing electricity and stricter policies of waste disposal.

Nevertheless, the Maldives have frequently come under criticism for their lack of protection of the local shark populations, which have sharply decreased after being hunted extensively for decades. In some areas, sharks have entirely disappeared. Sharks are hunted primarily for their fins. Shark fins are exported from the Maldives to other countries in Asia, where they are regarded as a delicacy. The fins are amputated from the live animals, which are then thrown back alive into the sea. Although this practice is prohibited by law in the Maldives, these laws are not respected or enforced by the local authorities.

In 2001, a local environmental organization called Seamarc/Marine savers (known onsite as Reefscapers), set up an ambitious program of reimplantation of coral in damaged areas, on the basis of resort sponsorship.

=== Natural environment ===
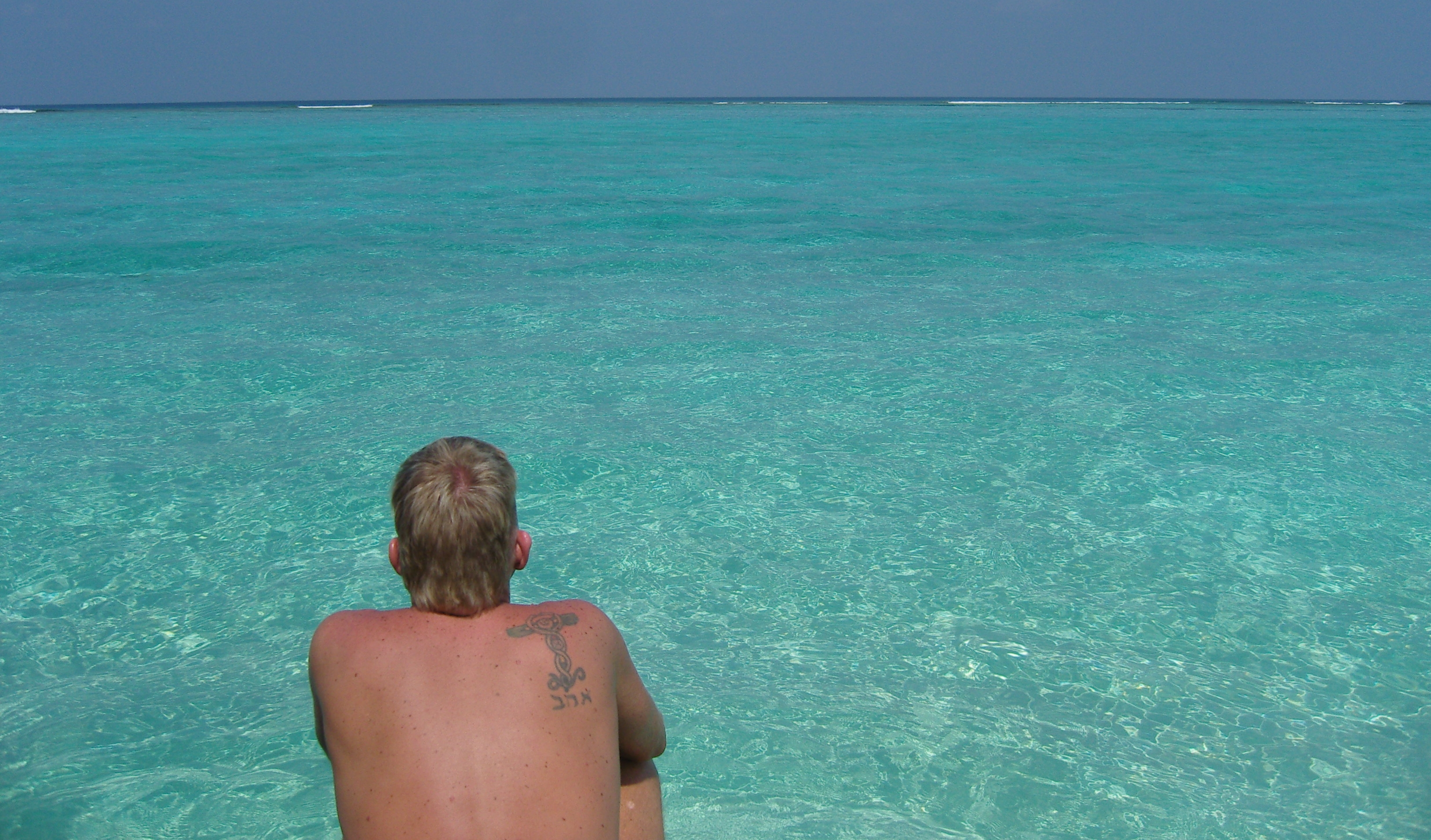
View from the beach on the turquoise ocean.

The Maldives' tourism industry is the country's largest revenue generator. Due to their underwater scenery and clean water, the Maldives is ranked among the best recreational diving destinations of the world, with over 60 local dive sites across the islands. It was also reported to be the world's most desired honeymoon destination, according to a global survey by Agoda.com.

== Safety concerns ==
Outside of the resorts, the level of crime in the Maldives is high; it is not safe for women. Attacks with knives in populated areas, like the capital Male, have increased. Tourists should also follow local advice as to whether there is any danger with swimming. Some piracy and armed robbery attacks have also occurred in the area of Gulf of Aden and Horn of Africa. A threat of terrorism is possible; the targets can include: government buildings, schools, places of worship, airports, public places, etc.

On 5 February 2018, the government declared a state of emergency due to the increased protests and aggressive clashes with the police in Malé. Those demonstrations are advised to be avoided.

On 18 June 2023, a Chinese national took to Twitter to share a harrowing incident she encountered during her stay at Maldives’ luxurious Ritz-Carlton resort. In her long Twitter thread, the 26-year-old Chinese tourist accused a resort staff named Usham of sexual assault. She also accused the resort management and the Maldivian police of hushing the matter and taking no coercive steps to investigate her case. The victim, a Chinese national currently pursuing her studies in Australia, in a long Twitter thread wrote that she had reached Maldives on the 6th of June and was scheduled to return to China on the 10th but she decided to extend her stay and checked into the Ritz Carlton Fari Island resort, unaware of the horror that would befall her. Ritz-Carlton Fari Island Resort, owned by The Ritz-Carlton Hotel Company and a subsidiary of Marriott International, high-end resort known for its pristine beaches and world-class hospitality.

== List of tourist attractions in Maldives ==
=== Male ===
- Malé Friday Mosque
- Kuruhinna Tharaagandu archaeological site
- Lonuziyaaraiy Park
- Muliaage Palace
- Gadi Buru clock tower
- Male's National Museum
- Male's Fish Market
- Tsunami Monument
- Malé Eid Mosque

=== Addu ===
- Addu Nature Park
- Shangri-La's Villingili Resort & Spa
- Banana Reef Addu
- Canareef Eco Park
- Hithadhoo Farming Land

== See also ==
- Economy of the Maldives
- Visa policy of Maldives
- Ministry of Tourism (Maldives)
- Maldives Marketing and Public Relations Corporation scandal
