= Mahibadhoo =

Mahibadhoo މަހިބަދޫ
- Inhabited island
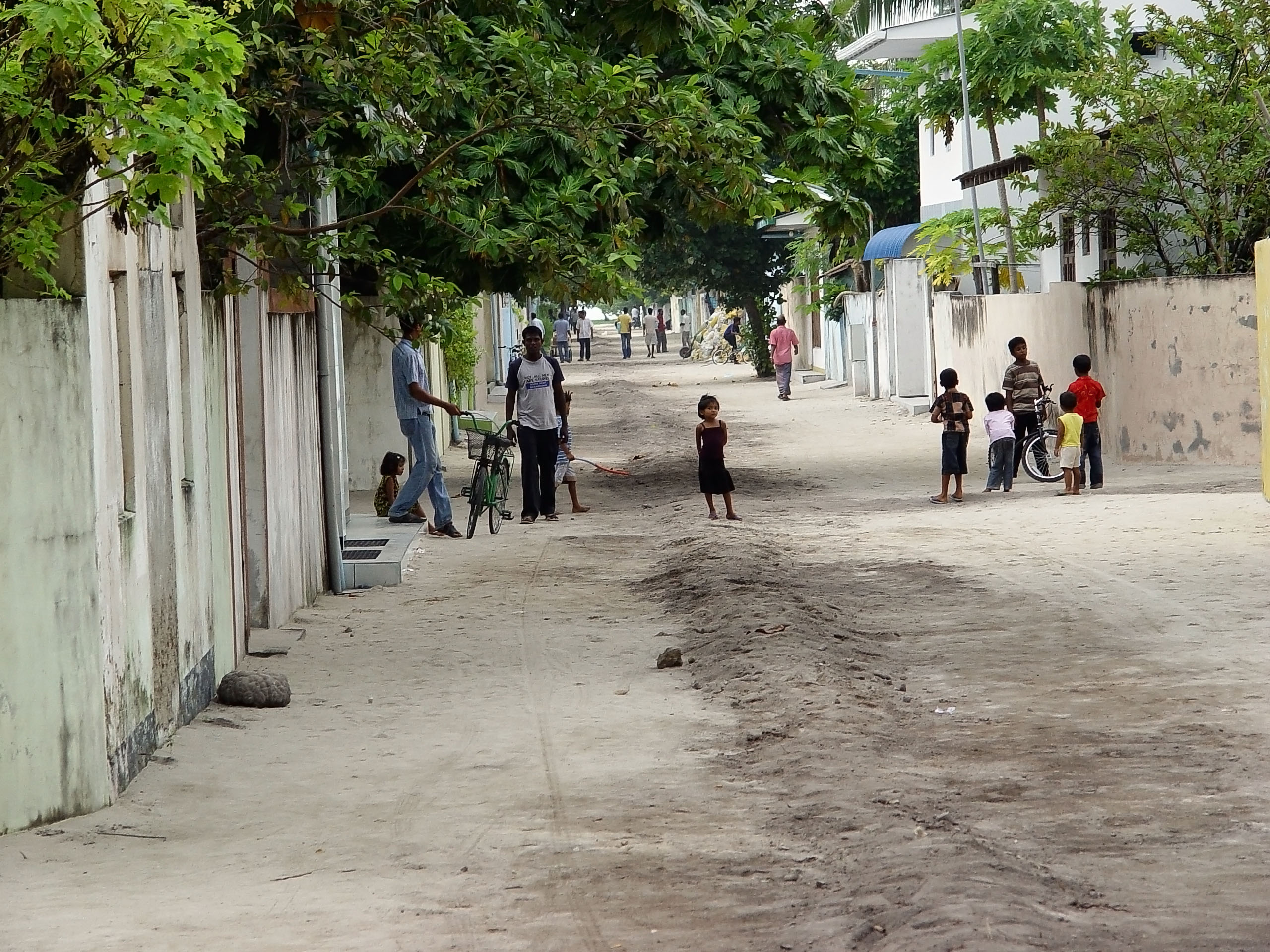

- Location in Maldives
- Coordinates: 3°45′27.07″N 72°58′7″E
- Country: Maldives
- Administrative atoll: South Ari Atoll
- Distance to Malé: 75.72 km (47.05 mi)

Government
  - President of the Mahibadhoo Council: Rashadh Ali

Area
  - Total: 0.1770 km^{2} (0.0683 sq mi)

Dimensions
  - Length: 1.00 km (0.62 mi)
  - Width: 0.305 km (0.190 mi)

Population (2022)
  - Total: 2,580
  - Density: 14,600/km^{2} (37,800/sq mi)
- Time zone: UTC+05:00 (MST)
- Website: mahibadhoo.gov.mv

Mahibadhoo (Dhivehi: މަހިބަދޫ) is an island town in central Maldives, and is the capital of South Ari Atoll.

== Geography ==
The island is 75.72 km (47 mi; 41 nmi) southwest of the country's capital, Malé. The island measures 2.4 km (1.5 mi) in length and 1.21 km (0.75 mi) in width.

=== Climate ===
Mahibadhoo has a tropical monsoon climate (Köppen: Am).

Climate data for Mahibadhoo
Month	Jan	Feb	Mar	Apr	May	Jun	Jul	Aug	Sep	Oct	Nov	Dec	Year
Mean daily maximum °C (°F)	27.5 (81.5)	27.8 (82.0)	28.3 (82.9)	28.7 (83.7)	28.6 (83.5)	28.4 (83.1)	28.2 (82.8)	28.1 (82.6)	27.9 (82.2)	27.8 (82.0)	27.6 (81.7)	27.5 (81.5)	28.0 (82.5)
Daily mean °C (°F)	26.9 (80.4)	27.2 (81.0)	27.7 (81.9)	28.0 (82.4)	27.8 (82.0)	27.8 (82.0)	27.5 (81.5)	27.4 (81.3)	27.2 (81.0)	27.1 (80.8)	26.9 (80.4)	26.9 (80.4)	27.4 (81.3)
Mean daily minimum °C (°F)	26.3 (79.3)	26.5 (79.7)	27.0 (80.6)	27.1 (80.8)	26.9 (80.4)	26.9 (80.4)	26.6 (79.9)	26.6 (79.9)	26.3 (79.3)	26.2 (79.2)	26.0 (78.8)	26.1 (79.0)	26.5 (79.8)
Average precipitation mm (inches)	77.4 (3.05)	44.6 (1.76)	69.8 (2.75)	116.5 (4.59)	223.7 (8.81)	104.6 (4.12)	124.9 (4.92)	147.1 (5.79)	185.0 (7.28)	198.6 (7.82)	250.4 (9.86)	198.3 (7.81)	1,740.9 (68.56)
Source: Weather.Directory

== Demography ==
Historical population
Year	Pop.	±%
2006	1,780	—
2014	1,939	+8.9%
2022	2,580	+33.1%
2006-2022: Census populations Source:

== Governance ==
Mahibadhoo island is governed by the Secretariat of Mahibadhoo Council. The island council is administered by the local government authority.

Councilors

President Rashad Ali.

Vice President Ibrahim Shathir.

Councilor Shaufa Adam.

Councilor Mohamed Maumoon.

Councilor Muneefa Adam.

Executives

Council Executive Mohamed Faiz.

A.Council Executive Mohamed Naushad.

The Mahibadhoo Constituency, which includes neighboring Kun'burudhoo and Hangnaameedhoo, is represented in the parliament by Ahmed Thoriq, a parliamentary member of the Progressive Party of Maldives (PPM). In April 2019, Ahmed Thoriq was elected for a second term, and will represent the constituency at least until 2024.

== Economy ==
With a population of around 2500 people, the livelihood of most families depend on fishing, tourism and public service.

A significant number of the younger population of Mahibadhoo are employed at tourist resorts. As of 2022, nine locally owned guesthouses operate from the island.

As the atoll's governing island, divisions and branches of several public offices are based in Mahibadhoo. Such institutions are a primary source of income for many individuals.

Mahibadhoo has also seen a growth in small businesses, ranging from coffee shops and grocery stores, to guesthouses and speedboat ferry services.

On January 12, 2020, a state-sponsored grouper farming project was launched in Mahibadhoo, led by the Ministry of Fisheries, Marine Resources and Agriculture. The pilot project is part of the sustainable fisheries resource development project of the ministry, and is being funded by the World Bank.

== Infrastructure and Services ==
Notable public buildings in the island include the atoll council, atoll hospital, the island council, police station, atoll education center, a branch of BML, a magistrate court, a division of STELCO and of FENAKA corporation, an ice plant, and four mosques (one of which is no longer being used for worship).

The streets of Mahibadhoo, with the exception of some roads, are paved with stone. Other public places include a FIFA-approved turf football ground, south harbor and its adjoining park, the north harbor, a volleyball court, a netball ground and a mat-floored futsal pitch. On the western coast of the island resides "Bun'baru Beach" for the public, and a private beach exclusively for tourists.

Private facilities in Mahibadhoo include guesthouses, speedboat ferry service providers, coffee shops and restaurants.

== Education ==
In Mahibadhoo, education for adolescents begin from baby-nursery at the Mahibadhoo Pre-school. Primary and secondary schooling, up to O'levels (Grade 10) is provided by the Atoll Education Center. Students can choose from business, science or B-tech stream to major in. Students in pursuit of high school education continue their studies in capital Male'.

Mahibadhoo exhibits a campus of Villa College, which offers courses from certificate level to bachelor's and master's degrees, depending on demand for course application. The island also exhibits a branch of National Center for the Holy Qur'an.

== Healthcare ==
The Atoll Hospital is the primary healthcare provider for the people of South Ari Atoll. Some of the services available at the hospital include E.C.G, laboratory investigations, labor, x-ray, ultra sound scanning, vaccination, and medical examination as part of renewing/applying for work-permit. Specialist services including gynecology, pediatrics and dental treatments are included in the hospital's readily available services. The hospital holds an annual circumcision camp as well.

Procare Clinic and Dental Centre operates as a private clinic, and provides occasional specialist consultations, in addition to facilities including x-ray, laboratory investigations, eye-checkup and dentistry.

== Sports and Recreation ==
Mahibadhoo is known nationwide for its endeavors in sports, remarkably for the development of football players. The island is known worldwide for its football ground that has been featured on the worlds most famous and biggest platforms like FIFA, AFC. Mahibadhoo is the home town of former national team goalkeeper, Imran Mohamed, and former national team striker, Ahmed Thoriq. The two of them have retired from professional football. Other notable football players from Mahibadhoo include Samooh Ali, Asadhulla Abdhulla, Hussain Niyaz Mohamed.

In 2010, Imran and Tariq founded Mahibadhoo Sports Club, which was later promoted for, and then relegated from, the Dhivehi Premier League, the highest division of Maldivian Football. The Mahibadhoo Sports Club Academy plays a big role in developing new footballing talents from the island.

In July 2023, a new volleyball court was constructed on the northern harbor.
