= Bodufinolhu =

Bodufinolhu as a place name may refer to:

- Bodufinolhu (Alif Dhaal Atoll) (Republic of Maldives)
- Bodufinolhu (Baa Atoll) (Republic of Maldives)
- Bodufinolhu (Kaafu Atoll) (Republic of Maldives)
- Bodufinolhu (Laamu Atoll) (Republic of Maldives)
- Bodufinolhu (Thaa Atoll) (Republic of Maldives)
