= Enboodhoo =

Enboodhoo as a place name may refer to:

- Enboodhoo (Alif Dhaal Atoll) (Republic of Maldives)
- Enboodhoo (Baa Atoll) (Republic of Maldives)
- Enboodhoo (Kaafu Atoll) (Republic of Maldives)
