= South Ari Atoll MPA =

Protected area in Maldives

South Ari Atoll Marine Protected Area (MPA), sometimes abbreviated as SAMPA, is an area which extends from the western reef edge at Rangali to the northern reef at Dhigurah within the South Ari Atoll. Across the whole of this span, the official protected area is one kilometre wide. The total area of the protected area is 42 km². The government of Maldives first declared this area as a Marine Protected Area in 2009.

This area is a significant aggregation area for the whale shark, Rhincodon typus, and is one of the only places where whale sharks are resident year-round. Twelve species of threatened vertebrates also occur in the MPA, including whitetip reef sharks, chevron butterflyfish, and hawksbill sea turtles.
