= Omadhoo =

Omadhoo may refer to the following places in the Maldives:

- Omadhoo (Alif Dhaalu Atoll)
- Omadhoo (Thaa Atoll)
