= Ariadhoo =

- uninhabited island
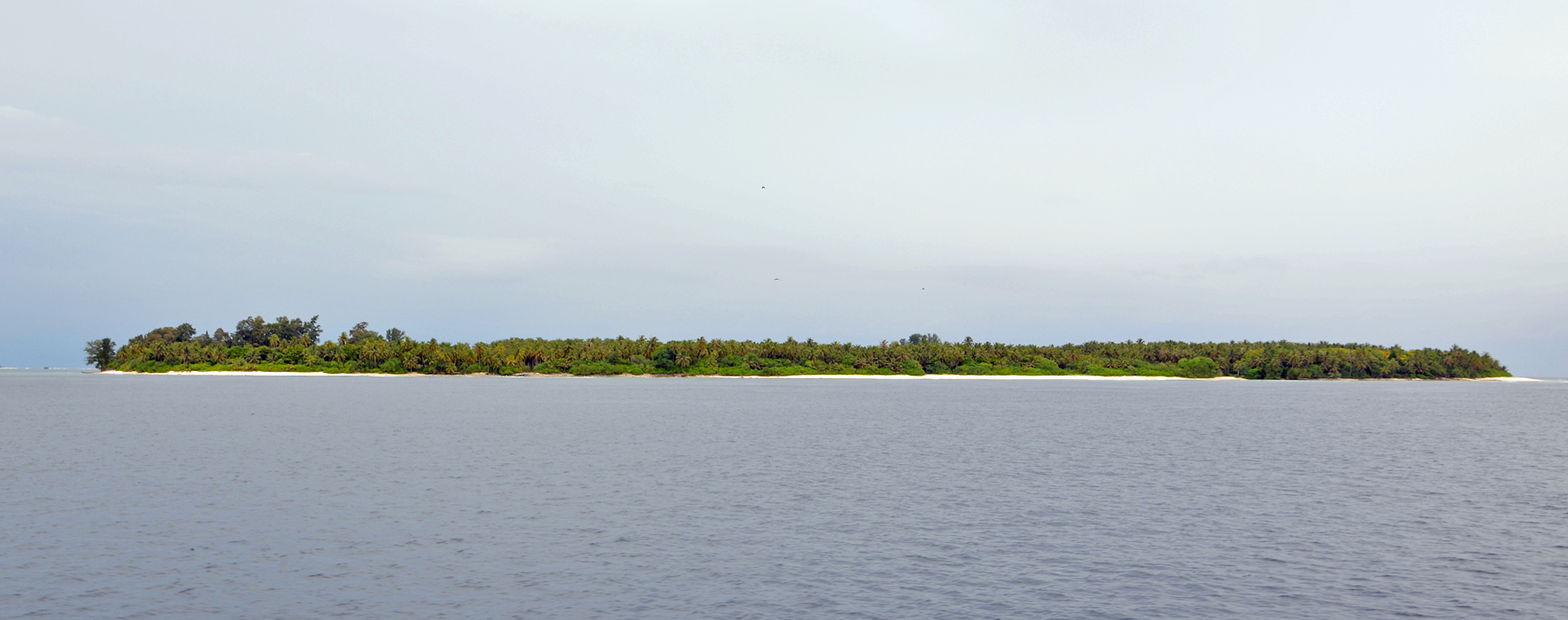

- Location in Maldives
- Coordinates: 03°28′32″N 72°51′18″E
- Country: Maldives
- Administrative atoll: Alif Dhaal Atoll
- Distance to Malé: 104 km (65 mi)

Population
  - Total: 0
- Time zone: UTC+05:00 (MST)

Ariadhoo (Dhivehi: އަރިއަދޫ) is one of the uninhabited islands of Alif Dhaal Atoll near Maamigili island. The name ”Ari Atoll” is also thought to originate from Ariadhoo island.

== Archaeology ==
There are important Buddhist remains on this island, including a stupa, indicating that it was inhabited in the past.
