= Gasfinolhu =

Gasfinolhu may refer to:

- Gasfinolhu (Alif Dhaal Atoll) (Republic of Maldives)
- Gasfinolhu (Kaafu Atoll) (Republic of Maldives)
- Gasfinolhu (Laamu Atoll) (Republic of Maldives)
