= Kudadhoo =

Kudadhoo as a place name may refer to:

- Kudadhoo (Alif Dhaal Atoll) (Republic of Maldives)
- Kudadhoo (Baa Atoll) (Republic of Maldives)
- Kudadhoo (Lhaviyani Atoll) (Republic of Maldives)
- Kudadhoo (Thaa Atoll) (Republic of Maldives)
