= Dhigurah =

Dhigurah as a place name may refer to:

- Dhigurah (Alif Dhaal Atoll) (Republic of Maldives)
- Dhigurah (Gaafu Alif Atoll) (Republic of Maldives)
- Dhigurah (Shaviyani Atoll) (Republic of Maldives)
- Dhigurah (Noonu Atoll) (Republic of Maldives)
