= Kunburudhoo =

Kunburudhoo may refer to the following places in the Maldives:

- Kunburudhoo (Alif Dhaalu Atoll)
- Kunburudhoo (Haa Dhaalu Atoll)
