= Fenfushi =

Fenfushi ފެންފުށި
- Inhabited island
- Location in Maldives
- Coordinates: 3°29′23.35″N 72°47′0.56″E
- Country: Maldives
- Geographic atoll: Ari Atoll
- Administrative atoll: Alif Dhaal Atoll
- Distance to Malé: 110.62 km (68.74 mi)

Area
  - Total: 0.24 km^{2} (0.093 sq mi)

Dimensions
  - Length: 1.000 km (0.621 mi)
  - Width: 0.300 km (0.186 mi)

Population (2022)
  - Total: 1,000
  - Density: 4,200/km^{2} (11,000/sq mi)
- Time zone: UTC+05:00 (MST)

Fenfushi (Dhivehi: ފެންފުށި) is one of the inhabited islands of Ari Atoll, belonging to the Alif Dhaal Atoll administrative division.

== Geography ==
The island is 110.62 km (69 mi; 60 nmi) southwest of the country's capital, Malé.

== Demography ==
Historical population
Year	Pop.	±%
2006	560	—
2014	729	+30.2%
2022	1,000	+37.2%
2006-2022: Census populations Source:
