= Hangnaameedhoo =

Hangnaameedhoo ހަންޏާމީދޫ
- inhabited island
- Location in Maldives
- Coordinates: 03°50′57″N 72°57′18″E
- Country: Maldives
- Geographic atoll: Ari Atoll
- Administrative atoll: Alif Dhaal Atoll
- Distance to Malé: 71.29 km (44.30 mi)

Dimensions
  - Length: 0.950 km (0.590 mi)
  - Width: 0.225 km (0.140 mi)

Population (2022)
  - Total: 484
- Time zone: UTC+05:00 (MST)

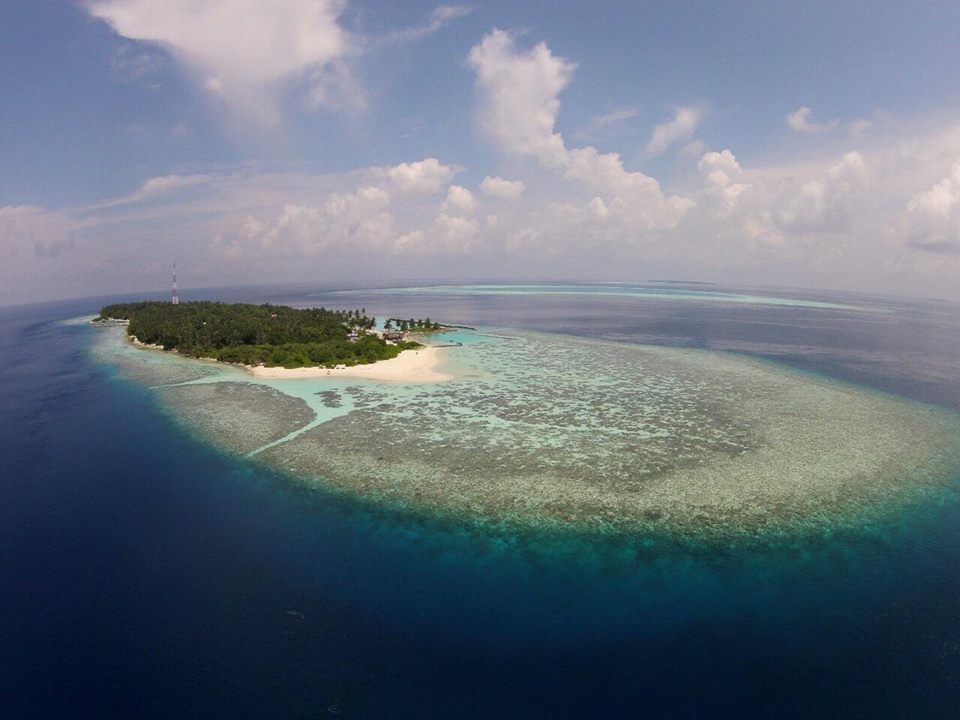
Hangnaameedhoo aerial view

Hangnaameedhoo (Dhivehi: ހަންޏާމީދޫ) is one of the inhabited islands of Ari Atoll, belonging to the Alif Dhaal Atoll administrative division.

== Geography ==
The island is 71.29 km (44 mi; 38 nmi) southwest of the country's capital, Malé.

== Demography ==
Historical population
Year	Pop.	±%
2006	458	—
2014	481	+5.0%
2022	484	+0.6%
2006-2022: Census populations Source:
