= Dhidhdhoo (Alif Dhaal Atoll) =

Dhidhdhoo ދިއްދޫ
- Inhabited island
- Location in Maldives
- Coordinates: 03°29′01″N 72°52′40″E
- Country: Maldives
- Administrative atoll: Alif Dhaal Atoll
- Distance to Malé: 103.75 km (64.47 mi)

Dimensions
  - Length: 1.500 km (0.932 mi)
  - Width: 0.150 km (0.093 mi)

Population (2022)
  - Total: 141
- Time zone: UTC+05:00 (MST)

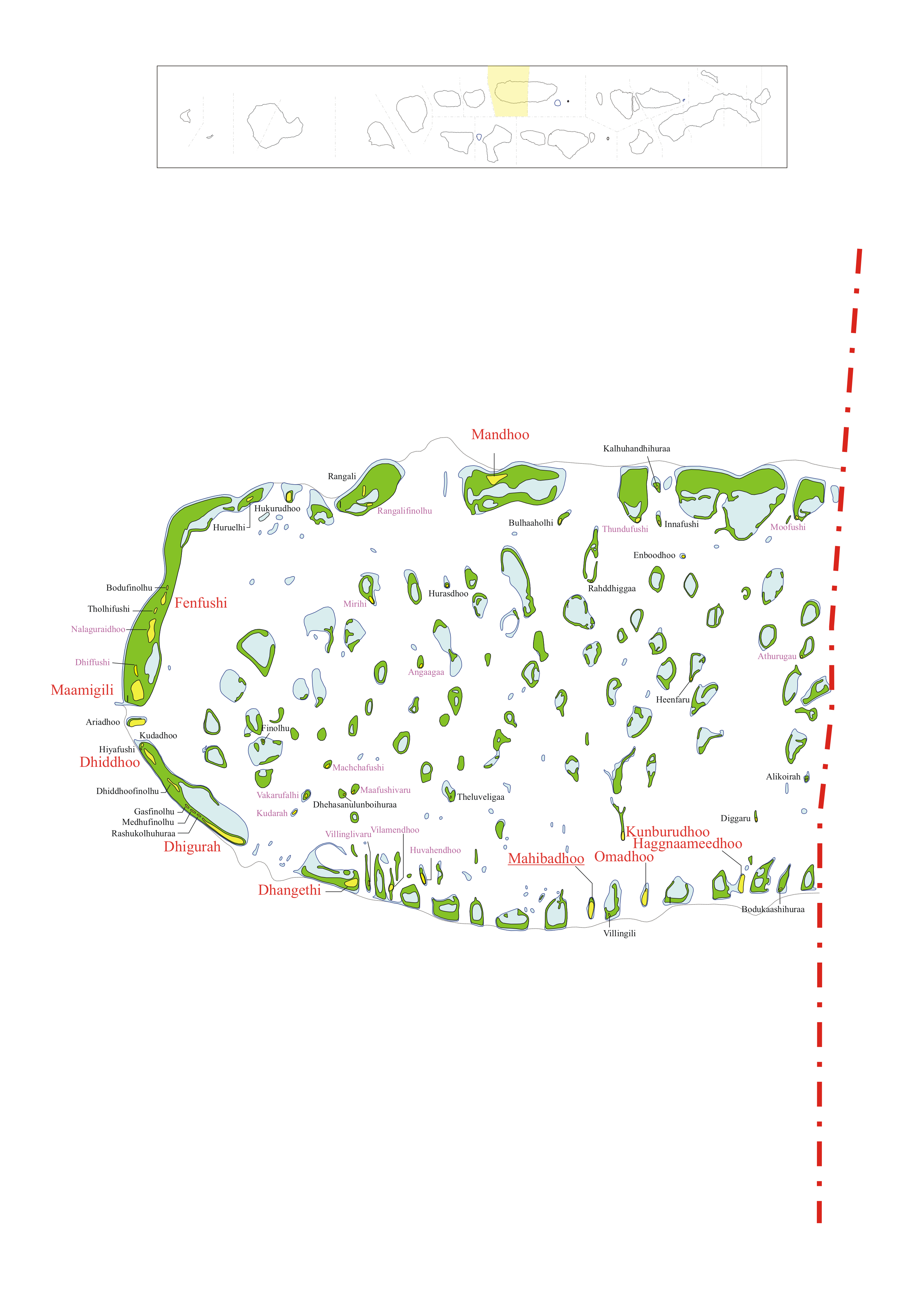
Alif Dhaal Atoll

Dhidhdhoo (Dhivehi: ދިއްދޫ) is one of the inhabited islands of Alif Dhaal Atoll.

== Geography ==
The island is 103.75 km (64 mi; 56 nmi) southwest of the country's capital, Malé.

== Demography ==
Historical population
Year	Pop.	±%
2006	116	—
2014	137	+18.1%
2022	141	+2.9%
2006-2022: Census populations Source:
