= Van Ceulen =

Van Ceulen is a Dutch toponymic surname meaning "from Cologne". Van Keulen is a modern spelling variant. People with this name include

- Cornelis Janssens van Ceulen (I) (1593–1661), Dutch/English portrait painter
- Cornelis Janssens van Ceulen (II) (1634–1715), Dutch/English painter
- Ludolph van Ceulen (1540–1610), German-Dutch mathematician
