= Dhangethi =

Dhangethi ދަނގެތި
- Inhabited island
- Location in Maldives
- Coordinates: 3.60746°N 72.95561°E
- Country: Maldives
- Administrative atoll: Alif Dhaal Atoll
- Distance to Malé: 87.85 km (54.59 mi)

Area
  - Total: 0.245 km^{2} (0.095 sq mi)

Dimensions
  - Length: 0.925 km (0.575 mi)
  - Width: 0.350 km (0.217 mi)

Population (2022)
  - Total: 936
  - Density: 3,820/km^{2} (9,890/sq mi)
- Time zone: UTC+05:00 (MST)
- Website: https://www.dhangethi.com

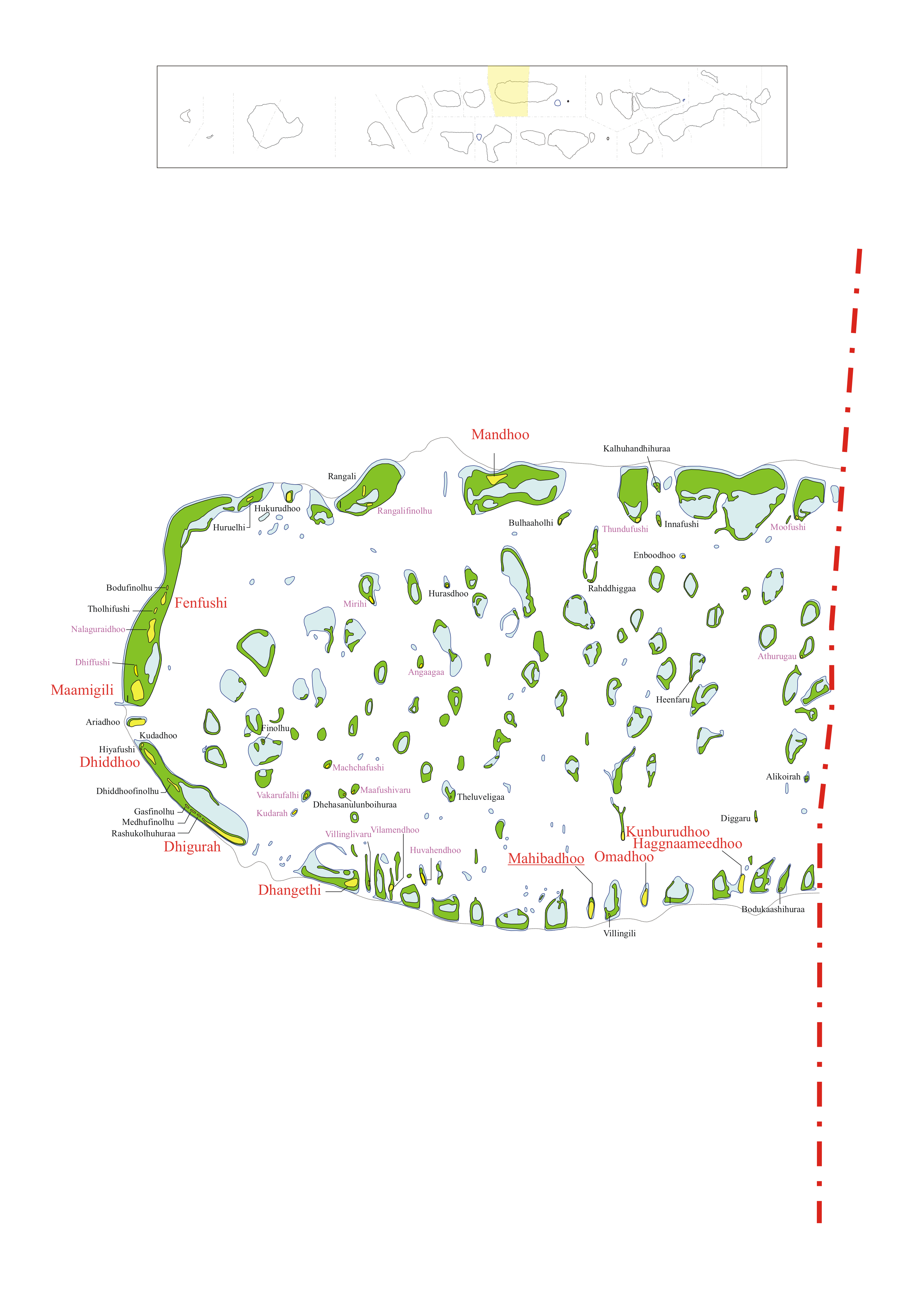
Alif Dhaal Atoll, where Dhangethi is located

Dhangethi (Dhivehi: ދަނގެތި) is one of the inhabited islands of Alif Dhaal Atoll.

== Geography ==
The island is 87.85 km (55 mi; 47 nmi) southwest of the country's capital, Malé. Dhangethi is the third largest populated island of Alif Dhaal Atoll.

== Demography ==
Historical population
Year	Pop.	±%
2006	624	—
2014	713	+14.3%
2022	936	+31.3%
2006-2022: Census populations Source:

== Education ==
Alif Dhaal Dhangethi School is the third largest school in the A.Dh atoll. Students can join to grade 1 at the age of 7 years and complete their O’ Level at the end of their 10th grade at this school. Those students doing O’ Level had chances to choose either Commerce stream or Science stream for their studies at Alif Dhaal Dhangethi School, but due to less student doing science stream and due to insufficient equipment in science laboratory, it has been called off after 2008 batch. However, lately in 2012, there has been introduced a combined stream since many students of that batch were wanting to take science or medical field in their future. And hopefully, the school will be developed and equipped with all the necessary requirements soon.

=== Non-Governmental Organisations ===
There are five clubs (NGOs) on the island, they are: Zuvaanunge Club (ZC), Jammiyathul Anwar, Jammiyathul Qalam, Association for Dhangethi Development (ADD) and Dhangethi Youth Development (DYD).

== Economy ==
=== Infrastructure and services ===
Important places in Dhangethi include the Secretriate of A dh. Dhangethi Council, Dhangethi Health Centre, Dhangethi School, Dhangethi Court, Dhangethi Cultural Centre, Traditional Mosque, football ground & Dhangethi Operation Centre (DOC) by Dhiraagu. Population of around 1200 people, major economic activities of the residents include fishing, handicraft, tourism related works, construction, boat building and carpentry. A vast majority of the male youth work in nearby tourist resorts, hence making tourism the highest money generating activity to the island.

Other services available in Dhangethi include guest house facilities, water sports, scuba diving center, speed boat rental services, hotel and catering services, Wireless internet connection and cable TV service.
