= Mandhoo =

Mandhoo މަންދޫ
- Inhabited island
- Location in Maldives
- Coordinates: 03°41′50″N 72°42′25″E
- Country: Maldives
- Administrative atoll: Alif Dhaal Atoll
- Distance to Malé: 103.57 km (64.36 mi)

Dimensions
  - Length: 1.250 km (0.777 mi)
  - Width: 0.550 km (0.342 mi)

Population (2022)
  - Total: 418
- Time zone: UTC+05:00 (MST)

Mandhoo (Dhivehi: މަންދޫ) is one of the inhabited islands of Alif Dhaal Atoll.

== Geography ==
The island is 103.57 km (64 mi; 56 nmi) southwest of the country's capital, Malé.

== Demography ==
Historical population
Year	Pop.	±%
2006	294	—
2014	295	+0.3%
2022	418	+41.7%
2006-2022: Census populations Source:
