= Machchafushi =

- holiday island resort
- Location in Maldives
- Coordinates: 3°35′37″N 72°53′1″E
- Country: Maldives
- Administrative atoll: Alif Dhaal Atoll
- Time zone: UTC+05:00 (MST)

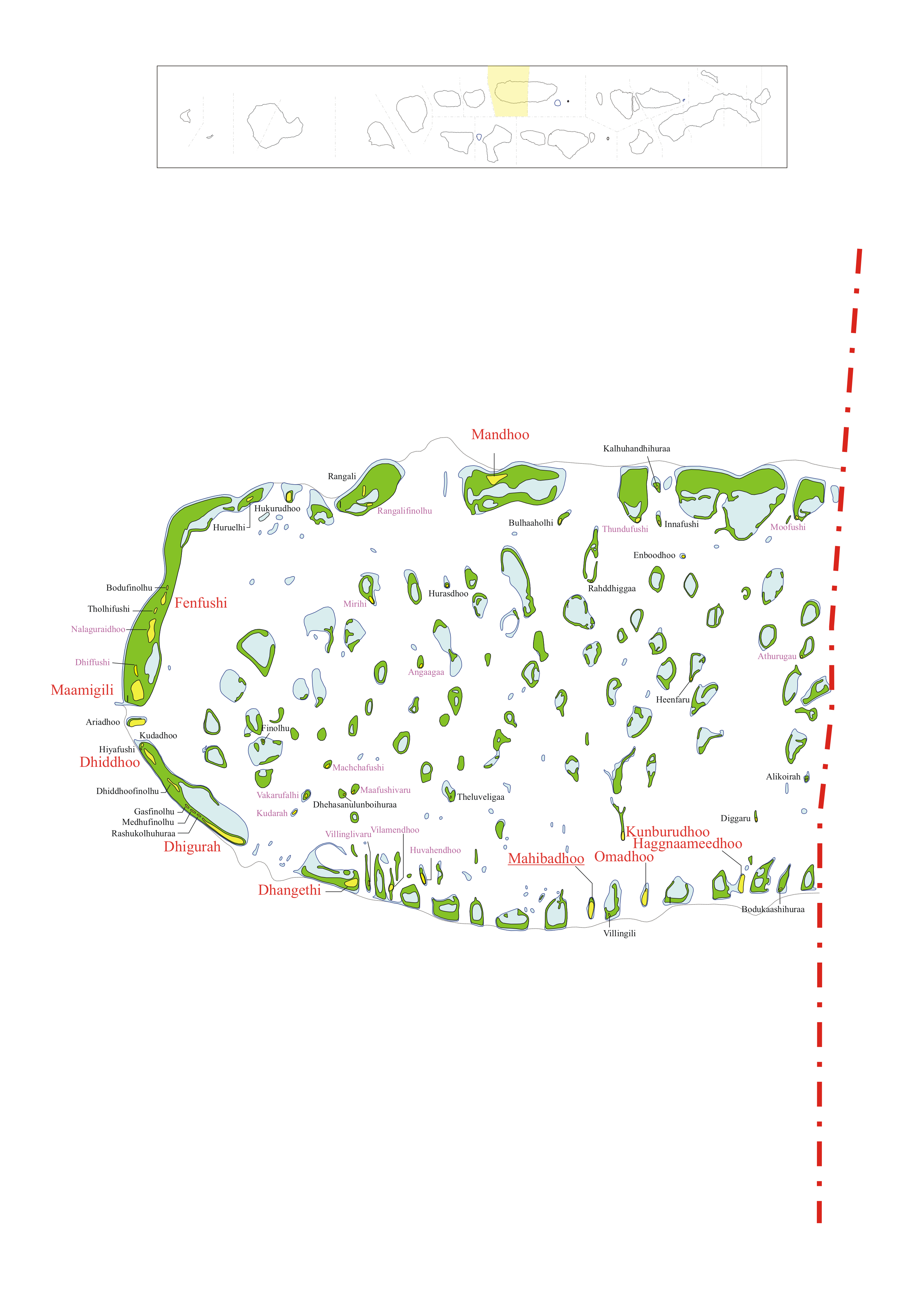

Machchafushi is one of the uninhabited islands of Alif Dhaal Atoll, Maldives.

It is the setting for the Centara Grand Island Resort & Spa Maldives resort, which is one of the 11 5-star properties run by Centara Hotels and Resorts.
