= Mirihi =

- Holiday Island Resort
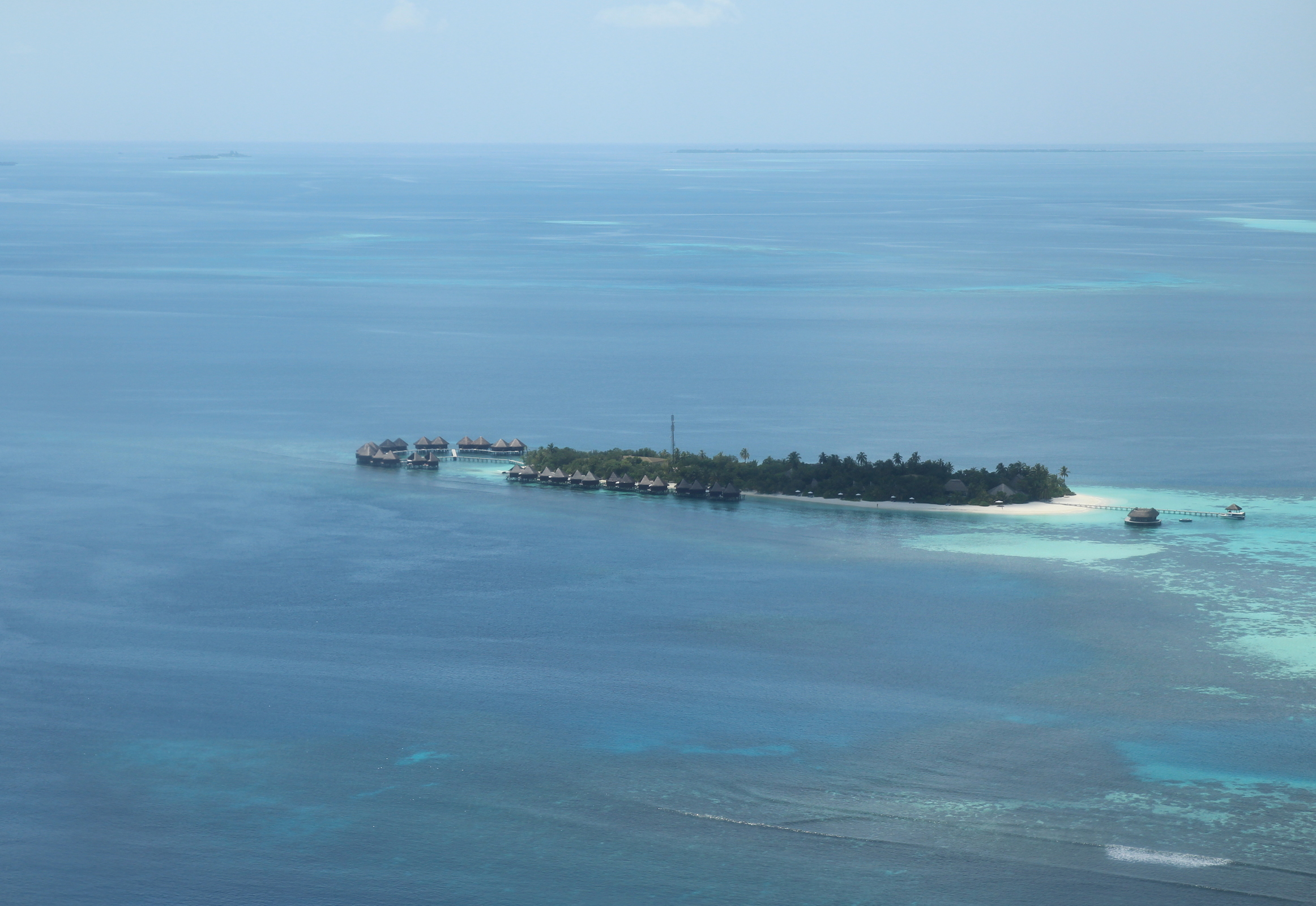

- Location in Maldives
- Coordinates: 03°37′10.028″N 72°46′49.847″E
- Country: Maldives
- Administrative atoll: Alif Dhaal Atoll
- Distance to Malé: 101 km (63 mi)

Area
  - Total: 0.015 km^{2} (0.0058 sq mi)

Dimensions
  - Length: 0.3 km (0.19 mi)
  - Width: 0.05 km (0.031 mi)

Population
  - Total: 0
  - Density: 0.0/km^{2} (0.0/sq mi)
- Time zone: UTC+05:00 (MST)

Mirihi is a small island in the Alif Dhaal Atoll. It measures approximately 300m by 50m.

Since 1989 hosts a "tourist island" and it was the first island in the Maldives with overwater bungalows.

The holiday resort consists of 38 guest bungalows consisting of 6 beach villas, 28 overwater villas and 2 overwater suites.

== House Reef & Diving ==
Since 1994 the dive center on the island is operated byOcean-Pro Mirihi. They are a 5-star PADI dive center.

The Madivaru "Manta Reef" is close by and is a location where a lot of manta rays can be found year-round.

In September 2000 a small trawler called the "Madi-ge", which can be translated as "House of Rays", was sunk to 22 meters close to the house reef allowing wreck divers to explore it. The "Madi-ge" lies bow down in the sand and attracts Batfish, Glassfish and Jacks.
