= Omadhoo (Alif Dhaalu Atoll) =

Omadhoo އޮމަދޫ
- Inhabited island
- Location in Maldives
- Coordinates: 03°47′27″N 72°57′50″E
- Country: Maldives
- Administrative atoll: Alif Dhaal Atoll
- Distance to Malé: 73.96 km (45.96 mi)

Dimensions
  - Length: 0.950 km (0.590 mi)
  - Width: 0.300 km (0.186 mi)

Population (2022)
  - Total: 913
- Time zone: UTC+05:00 (MST)

Omadhoo (Dhivehi: އޮމަދޫ) is one of the inhabited islands of Alif Dhaal Atoll in the Maldives.

== Geography ==
The island is 73.96 km (46 mi; 40 nmi) southwest of the country's capital, Malé.

== Demography ==
Historical population
Year	Pop.	±%
2006	676	—
2014	843	+24.7%
2022	913	+8.3%
2006-2022: Census populations Source:

According to the latest census conducted in 2018, the total population of Omadhoo is at 1089 out of which 840 are Maldivians, and above 150 foreigners.

== Governance ==
In accordance with the recently passed Decentralization Act of Maldives, Omadhoo is governed by an elected Island Council composed of three councillors. The council is headed by the president of the council. The Island Council reports to the Local Government Authority (LGA).

== Economy ==
As of January 2018 there are nine guest house in Omadhoo. The guest houses provide the island with direct employment, and many other indirect economic benefits to the island. Most guest houses are funded by direct investments by local residents of the island. However, recently there have been investments by businessmen in Male' and elsewhere.

Guest houses provide various excursions, including: whale shark watching, manta rays, off island snorkeling, fishing, scuba diving, sand bank and picnic island visiting (including overnight staying).

== Education ==
Omadhoo is served by combined one preschool and one primary/secondary school, Omadhoo School.

== Transport ==
Omadhoo is connected by ferry service from Malé. Some private companies provide scheduled speedboat service.
