= Angafaru =

Angafaru is a 404 ha protected area of marine biodiversity encompassing a 200m boundary outside the outer reef edge of Angafaru, Dhiguthila, Dhonfanu Thila and Mahaanagaa Thila, in the Maldives.

The site has rich biodiversity, being habitat for green and hawksbill turtles, groupers, clams, sea cucumbers and bait fish. During some periods of the year, dolphins, whale sharks and manta rays can be observed. The area also has manta ray "cleaning stations". In parts of Angafaru, the reef has a very large diversity of corals.

The name of the atoll is South Maalhosmadulu Atoll, southwest of Kihaadhoo island.

The location is: 1. 5 10’ 58.18"N, 73 07’ 46.53"E / 2. 5 11’ 03.33"N, 73 08’ 46.54"E / 3. 5 10’ 33.64"N, 73 09’ 40.81"E 4. 5 10’ 09.15"N, 73 09’ 16.10"E / 5. 5 10’ 18.78"N, 73 08’ 36.88"E / 6. 5 11’ 36.63"N, 73 08’ 00.84"E

The area was declared protected on 5 June 2009. The directive number was 138-EE/2009/19. The management authorities were the MHTE and the EPA.
