= Van Keulen =

Van Keulen is a Dutch toponymic surname meaning "from Cologne". Van Ceulen is an archaic spelling variant. People with this name include:

- Ada van Keulen (1920–2010), Dutch Resistance member
- Geert van Keulen (born 1943), Dutch composer, conductor and clarinetist
- Isabelle van Keulen (born 1966), Dutch violinist
- Johannes van Keulen (1654–1715), Dutch cartographer
- Joannes van Keulen (died 1572), Dominican priest and martyr (St. John of Cologne)
- Julie Van Keulen (born 1959), Australian Paralympic athlete
- Machiel van Keulen (born 1984), Dutch football midfielder
- Mensje van Keulen (born 1946), Dutch novelist (pseudonym of Mensje van der Steen)
- Susan van Keulen (born 1961), American judge

== See also ==
- Van Keulenfjorden, Spitsbergen fjord named in 1710 after the cartographer Gerard van Keulen, son of Johannes van Keulen
- Atje Keulen-Deelstra (1938–2013), Dutch speed skater
- Marino Keulen (born 1963), Belgian politician
