= Kunburudhoo (Alif Dhaalu Atoll) =

Kunburudhoo ކުނބުރުދޫ
- Inhabited island
- Location in Maldives
- Coordinates: 03°46′30″N 72°55′30″E
- Country: Maldives
- Geographic atoll: Alif Atoll
- Administrative atoll: Alif Dhaal Atoll
- Distance to Malé: 78.51 km (48.78 mi)

Population (2022)
  - Total: 509
- Time zone: UTC+05:00 (MST)

Kunburudhoo (Dhivehi: ކުނބުރުދޫ) is one of the inhabited islands of Alif Dhaal Atoll.

== Geography ==
The island is 78.51 km (49 mi; 42 nmi) southwest of the country's capital, Malé.

== Demography ==
Historical population
Year	Pop.	±%
2006	322	—
2014	438	+36.0%
2022	509	+16.2%
2006–2022: Census populations Source:

The population of the island is around 600.
