= Thudufushi =

- Island
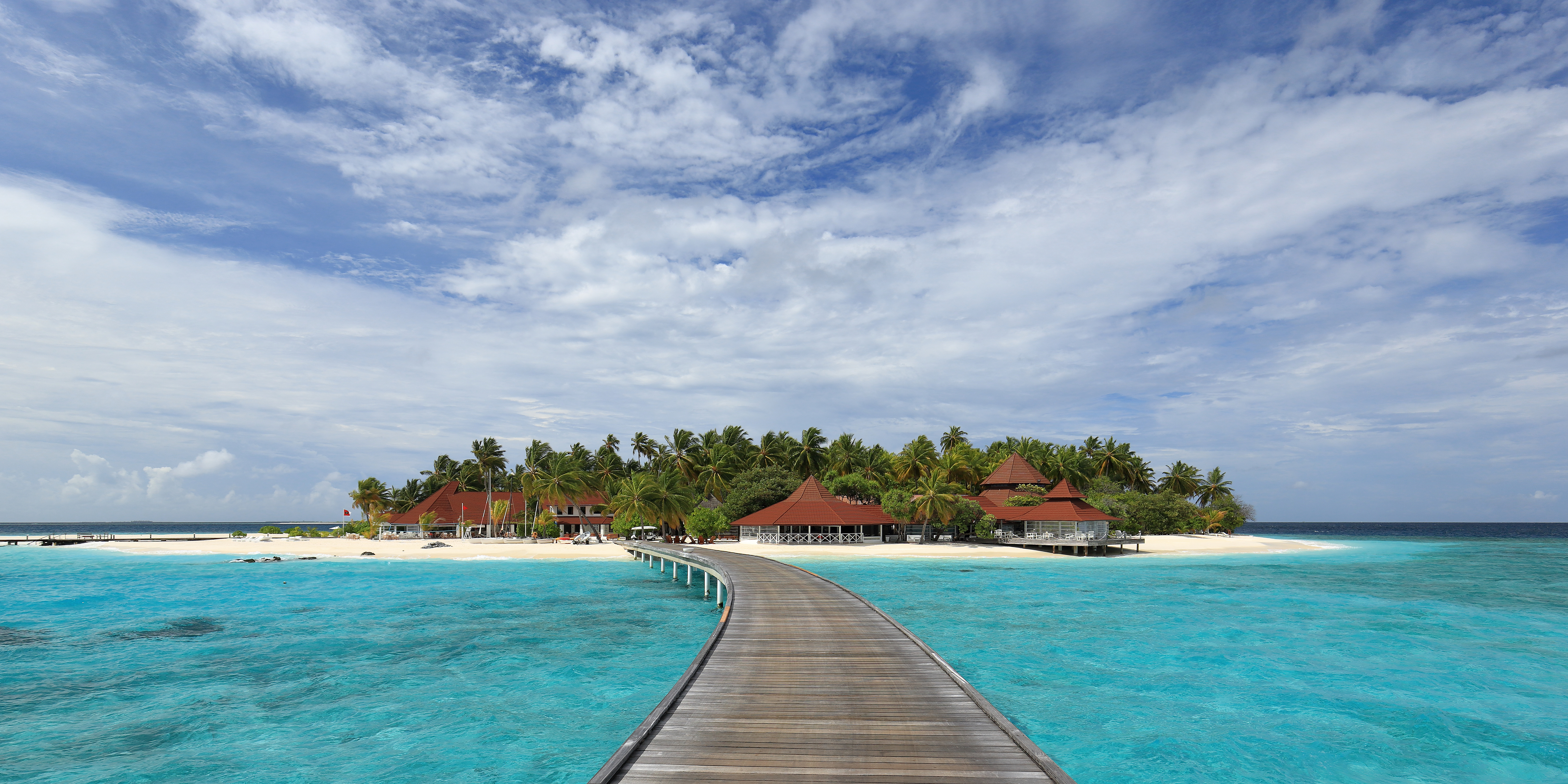

- Location in Maldives
- Coordinates: 3.786169°N 72.731091°E
- Country: Maldives
- Administrative atoll: Alif Dhaal Atoll
- Distance to Malé: 99 km (62 mi)

Area
  - Total: 0.046 km^{2} (0.018 sq mi)

Dimensions
  - Length: 0.24 km (0.15 mi)
  - Width: 0.19 km (0.12 mi)
- Time zone: UTC+05:00 (MST)

Thudufushi (sometimes spelled Thundufushi), formerly one of the uninhabited islands of Alif Dhaal Atoll (South Ari Atoll), Maldives, was developed into a 70 room 5 star resort called Diamonds Thudufushi Beach and Water Villas in 1990. It is managed by Planhotel Hospitality Group. Some of the best diving points in the Maldives are located in the Ari Atoll.

== Name ==
In Divehi, "Thudufushi" means "Point Island".

== Geography ==
Surrounded by a lagoon and long stretches of white, sandy beach, and encircled by a reef, it is the only resort on the island. It measures about 240 by 194 metres (787 ft × 636 ft) – 11 hectares (27 acres). Seaplane transfer from Male International Airport is a scenic, 25-minute flight.

== Reef ==
Due to the rise in temperature caused by La Niña, the coral reef had suffered but is starting to recover.

== Gallery ==
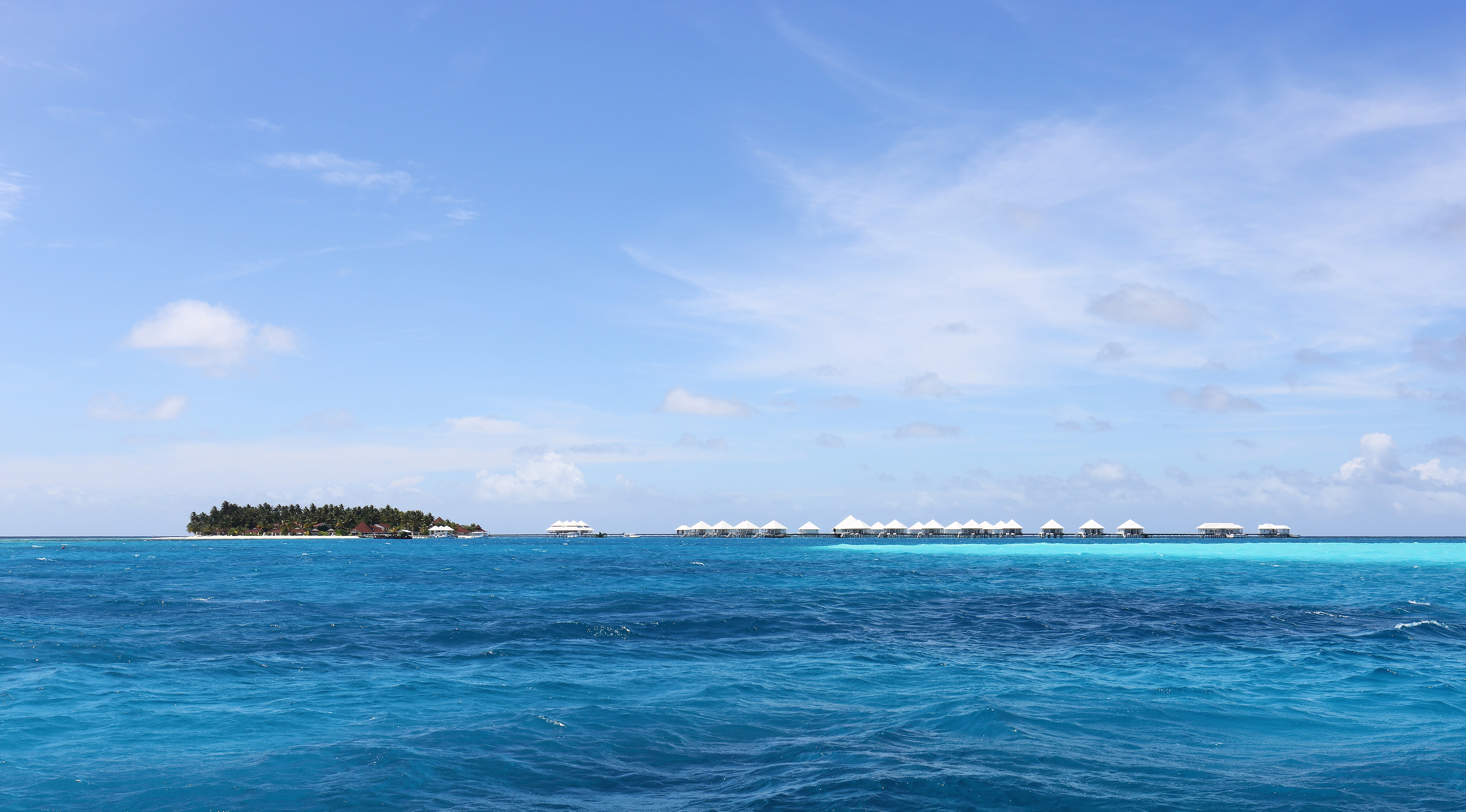

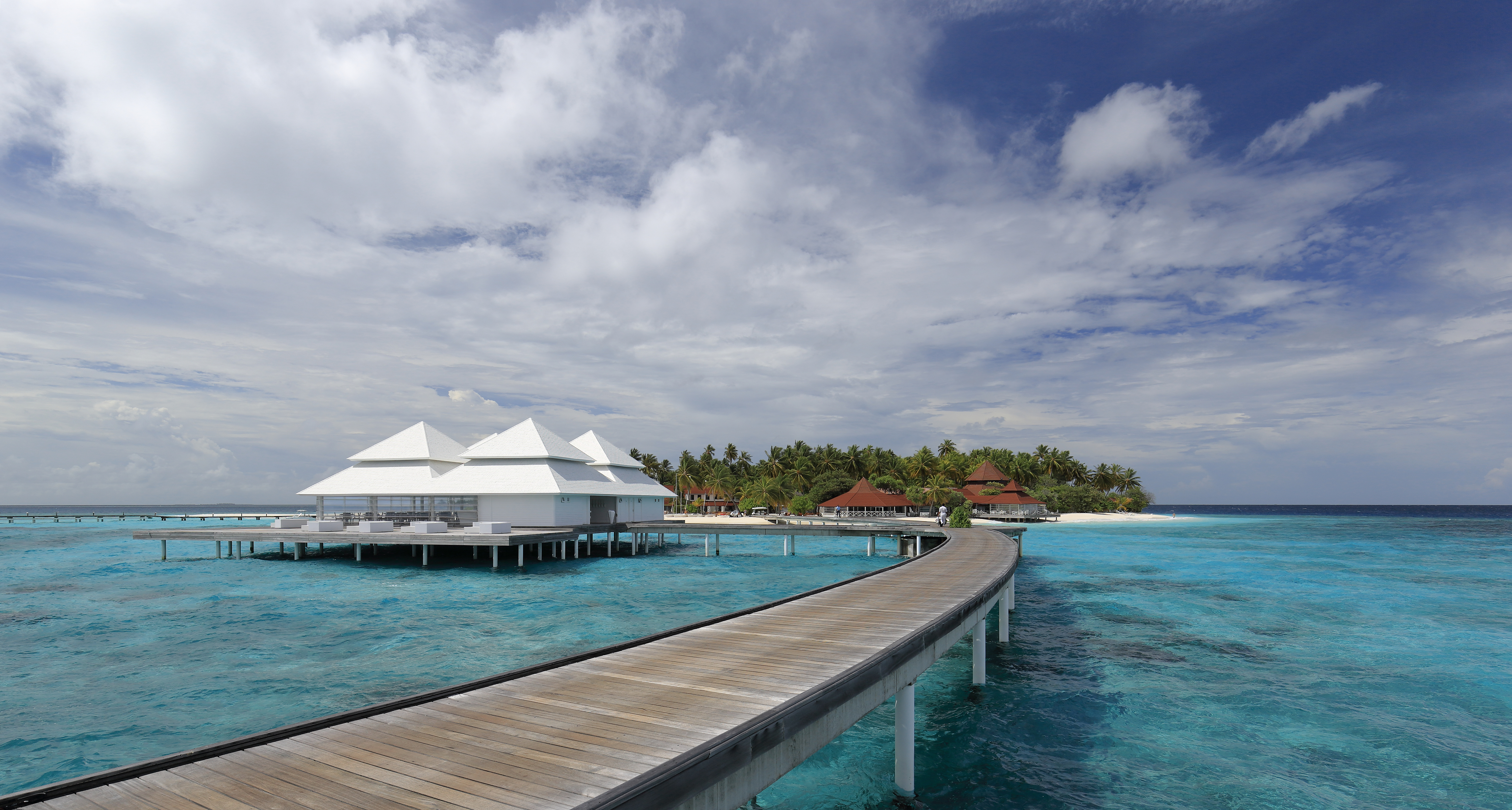

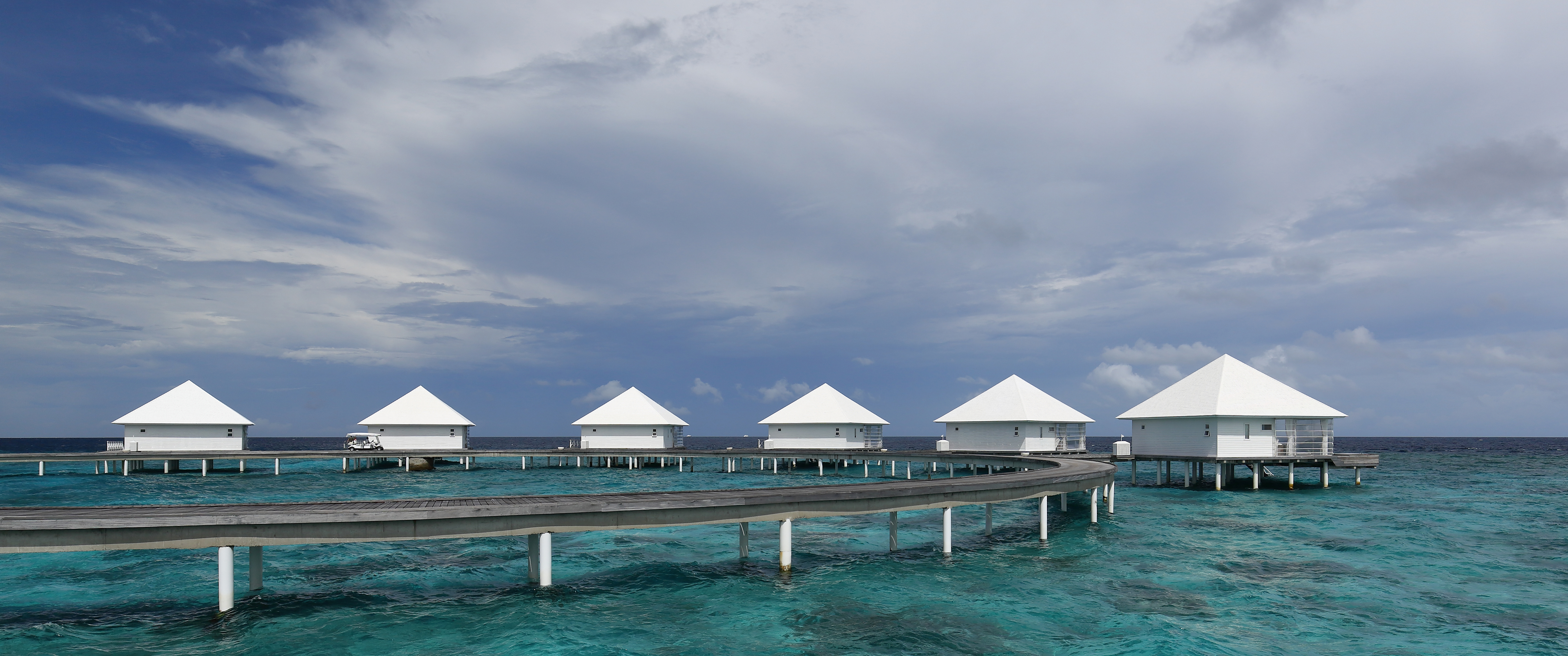

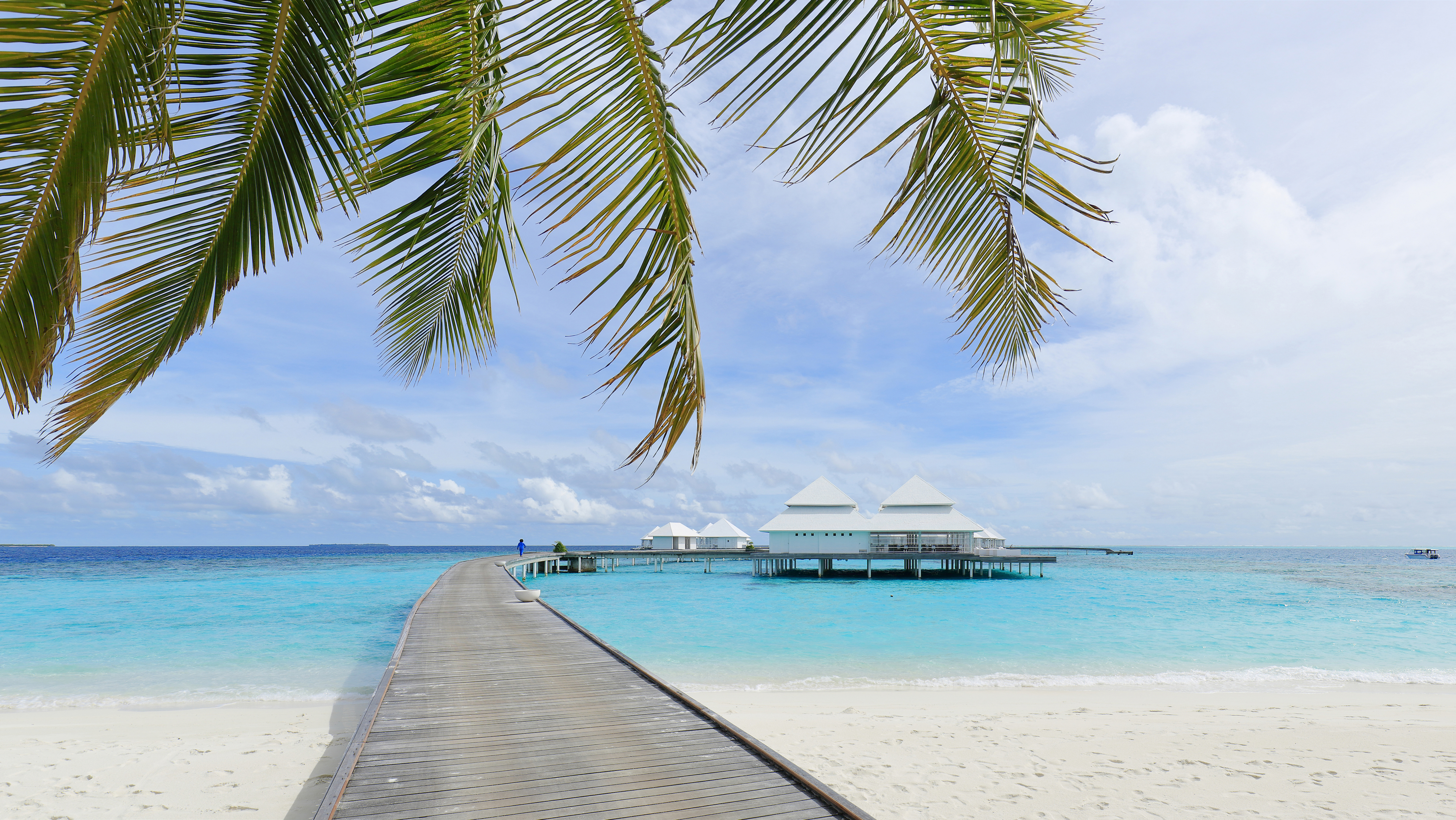

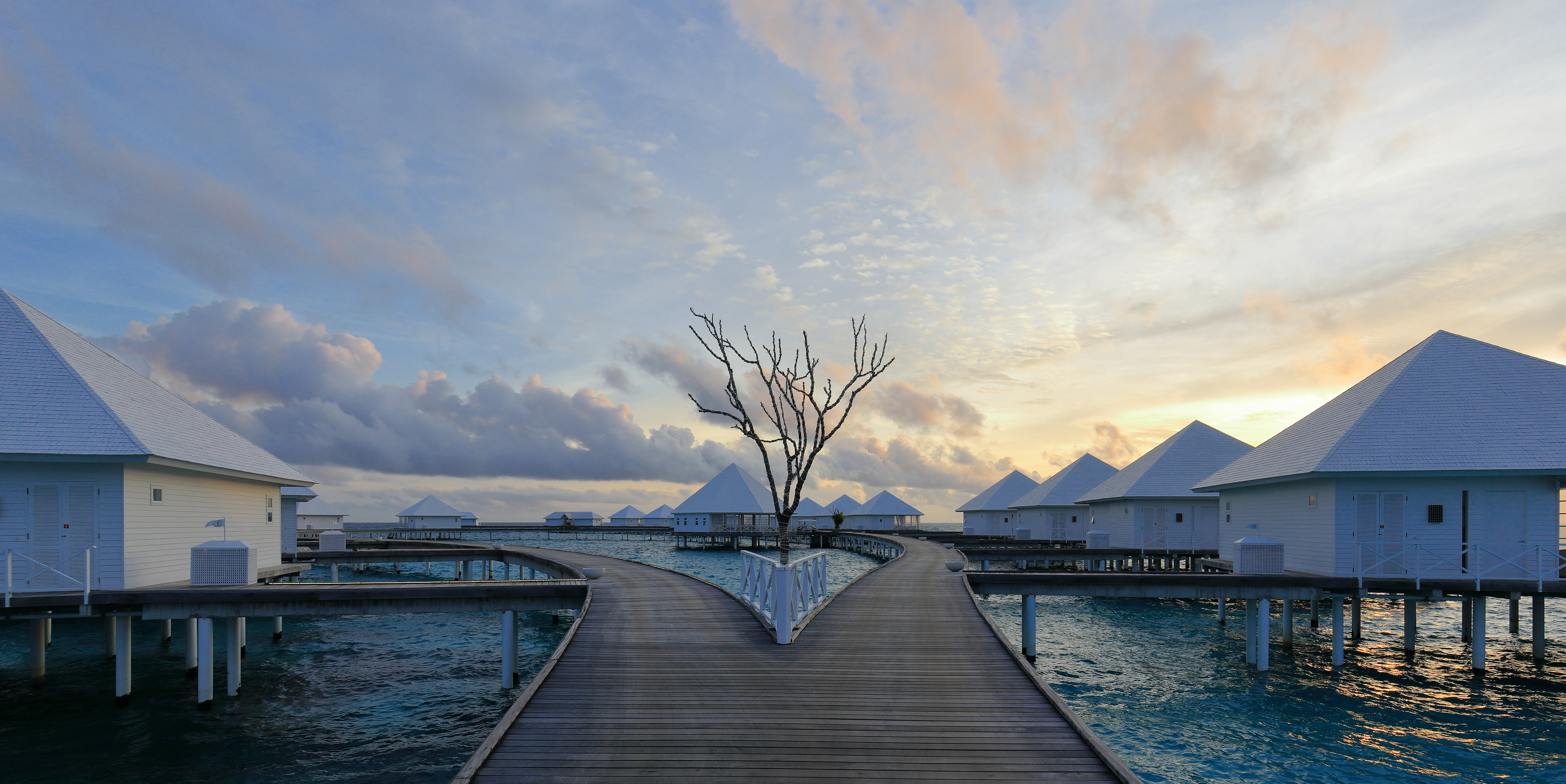
