= Ari Atoll =

Atoll in the Maldives

Coordinates: 3.86425°N 72.8339°E

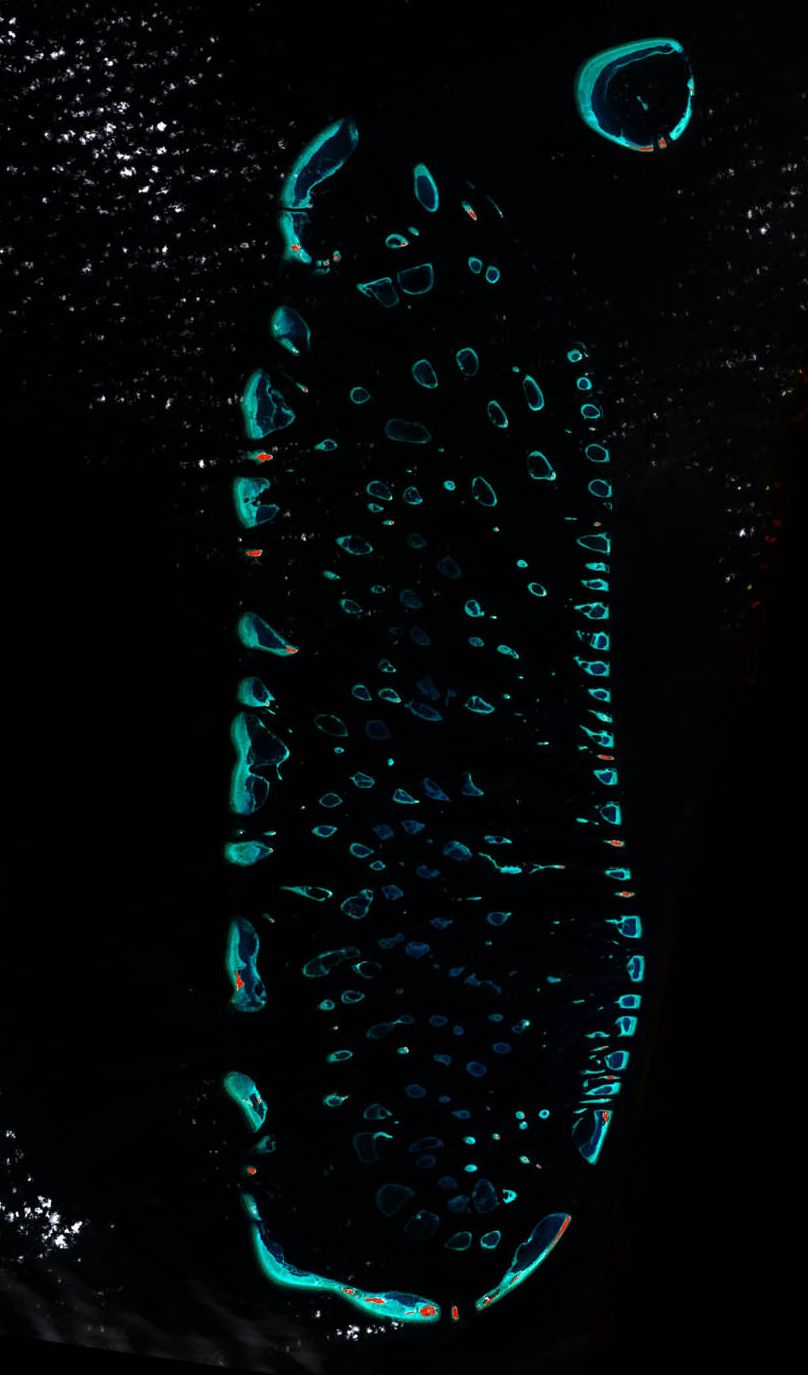
Ari Atoll

Ari Atoll (also called Alif or Alifu Atoll) is one of the natural atolls of the Maldives. It is one of the biggest atolls and is located in the west of the archipelago. The almost rectangular alignment spreads the islands over an area of about 89 by 3 kilometres (55.3 by 1.9 miles). It has been divided in two sections for administrative purposes, Northern Ari Atoll and Southern Ari Atoll consisting of 105 islands. Ari Atoll is part of the zone designated for tourist development in the Maldives. It is roughly a 30-minute seaplane flight away from the capital Malé.

There are more than 20 islands in the Atoll designated for tourist resorts. Each island resort is self-contained with accommodation and recreational facilities, such as a tennis court. Scuba diving is the most popular tourist activity in the Maldives. The diving in Ari Atoll is extensive and is often defined by location within the atoll, either North or South.

The main tourist resorts are Ari Beach, Halaveli, Maayyafushi, Twin Islands Resort, and Dhoni Mighilli.

== Gallery ==
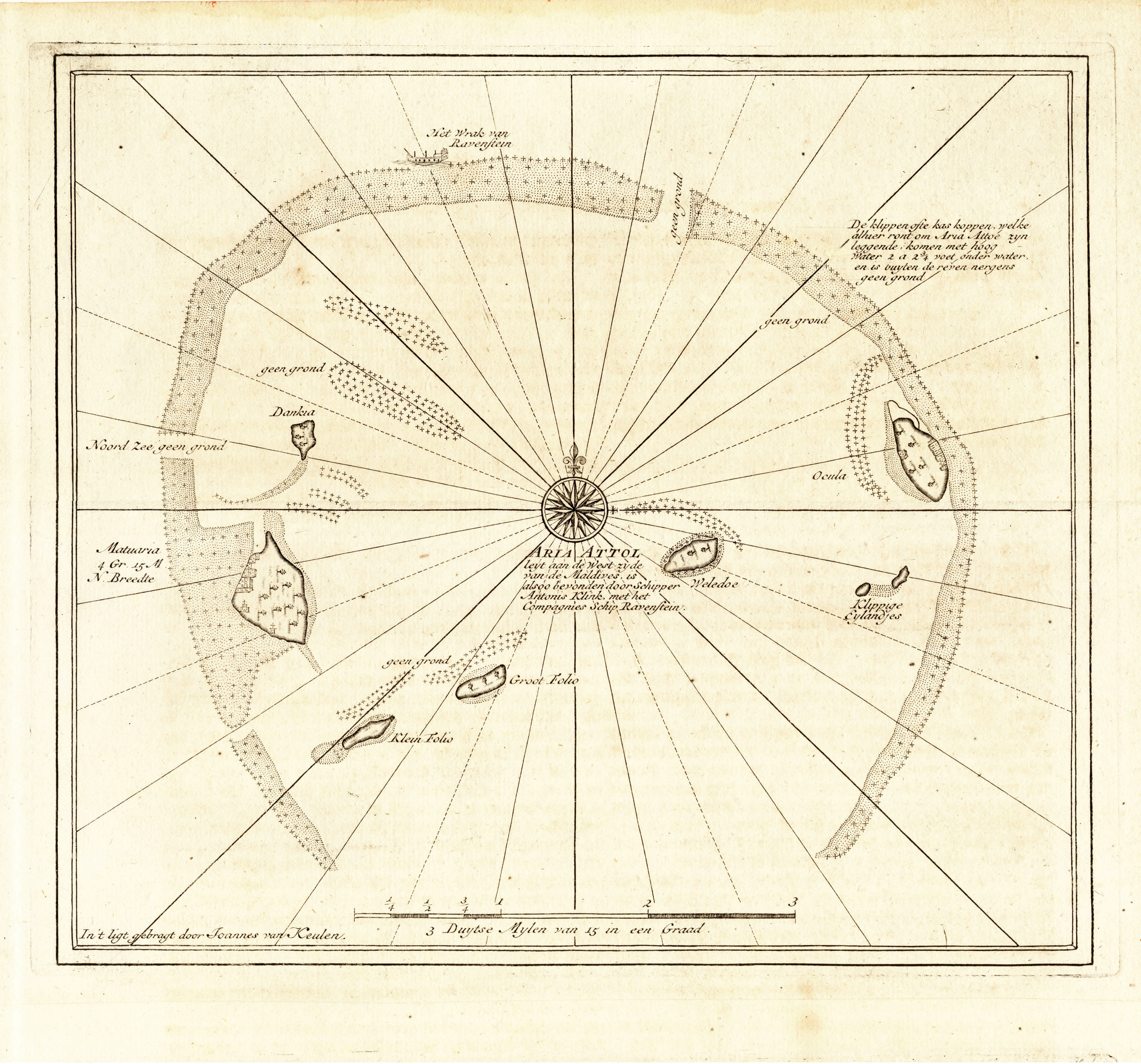
1753 Van Keulen Map of Ari Atoll

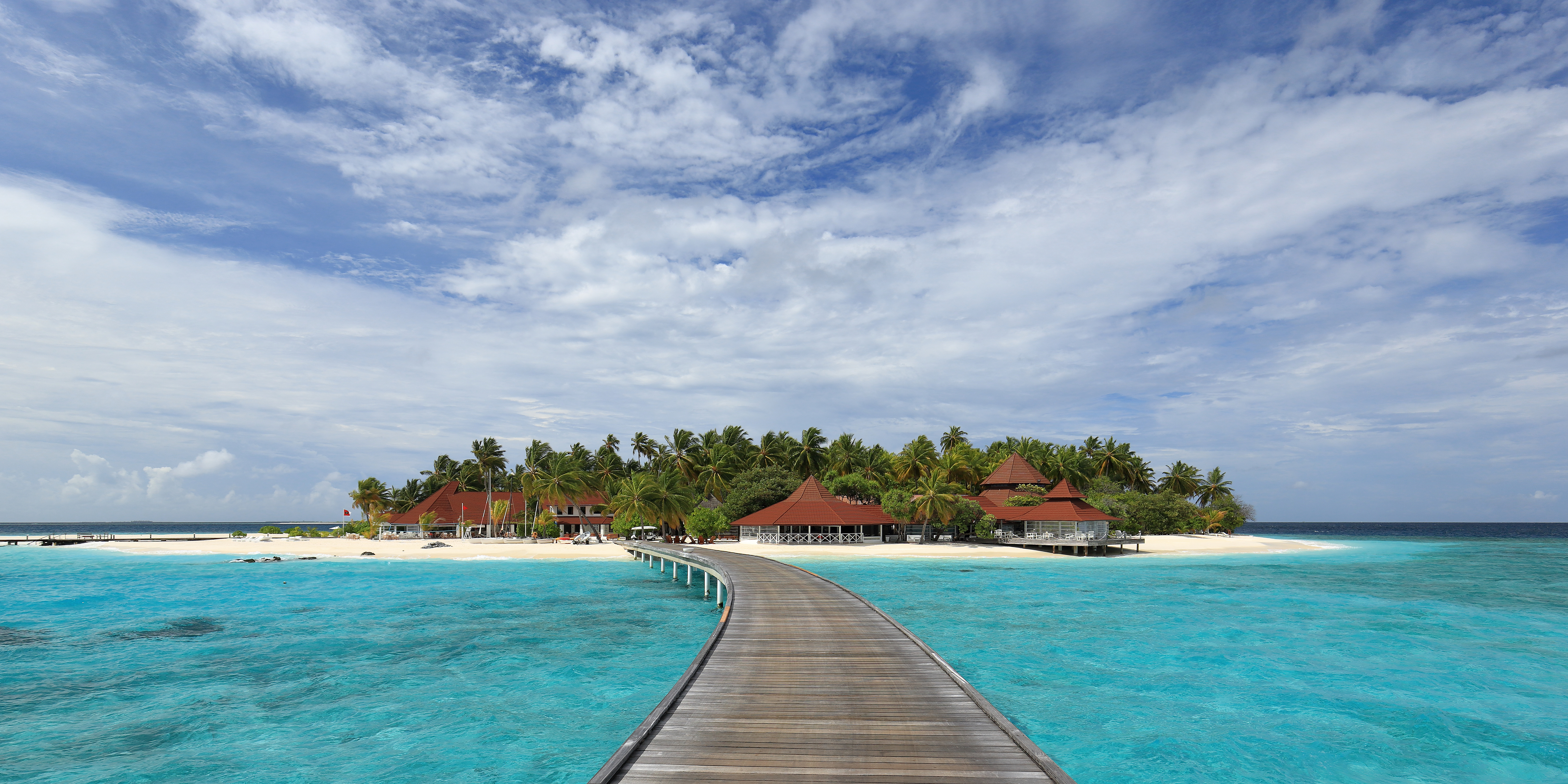
Thudufushi, one the many tourist resorts in the atoll

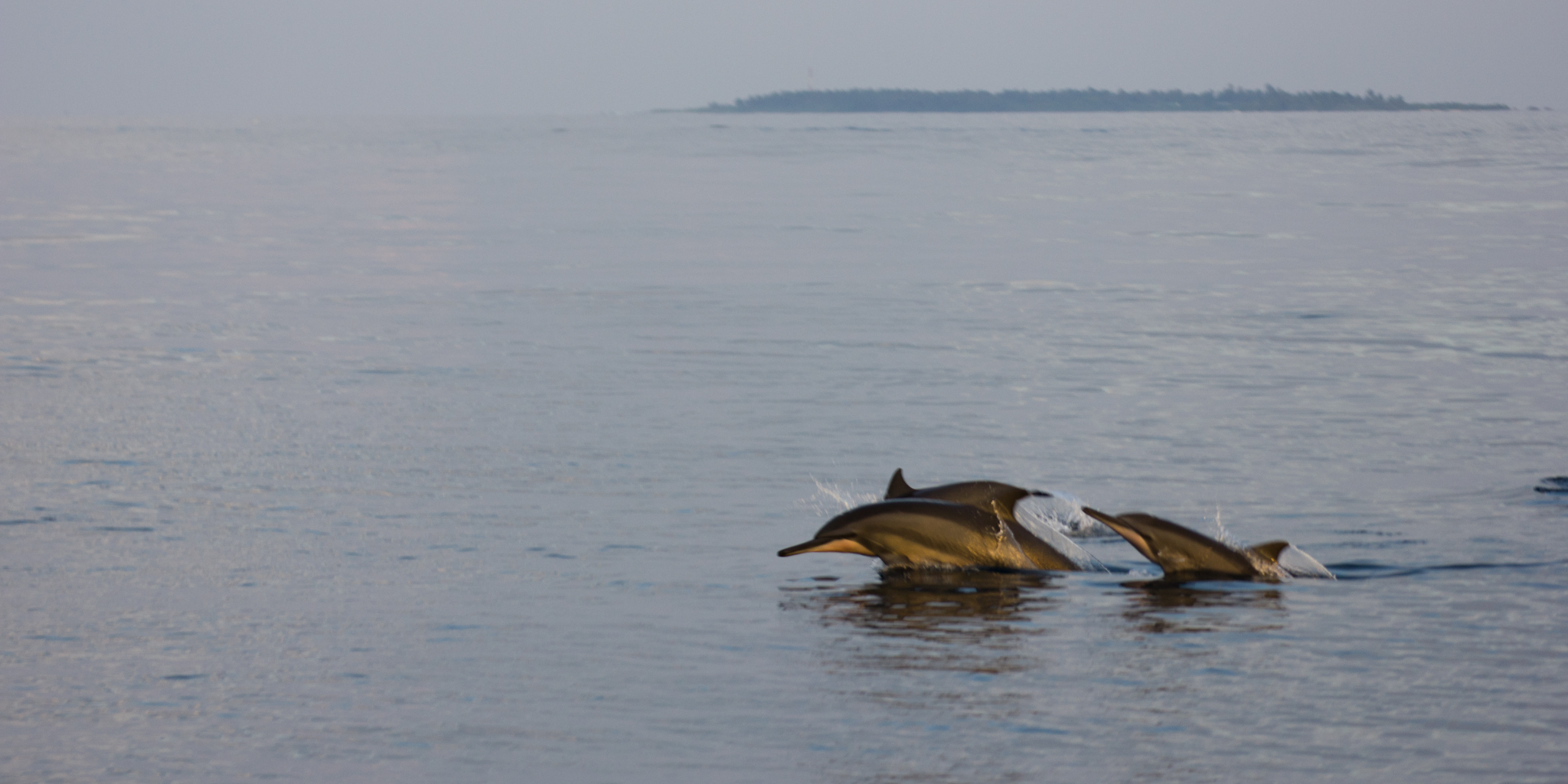
Spinner dolphins in the area
