= Dhigurah (Alif Dhaalu Atoll) =

Dhigurah ދިގުރަށް
- Inhabited island
- Location in Maldives
- Coordinates: 03°31′35″N 72°55′26″E
- Country: Maldives
- Administrative atoll: Alif Dhaal Atoll
- Distance to Malé: 96.8 km (60.1 mi)

Dimensions
  - Length: 3.175 km (1.973 mi)
  - Width: 0.275 km (0.171 mi)

Population (2022)
  - Total: 761
- Time zone: UTC+05:00 (MST)

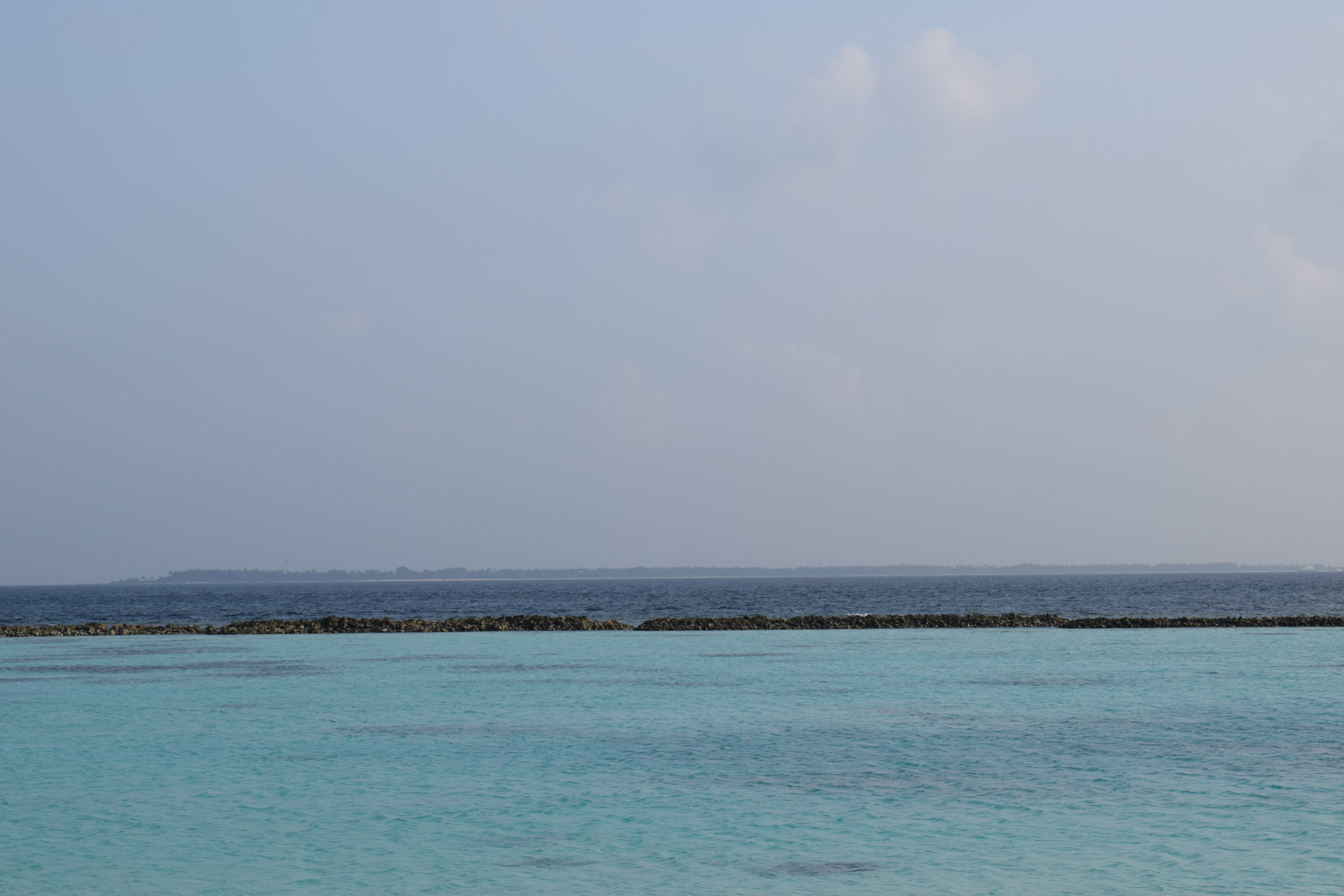
Dhigurah

Dhigurah (Dhivehi: ދިގުރަށް) is one of the inhabited islands of Alif Dhaal Atoll where whale sharks are year-round residents.

== Geography ==
The island is 96.8 km (60 mi; 52 nmi) southwest of the country's capital, Malé.

== Demography ==
Historical population
| Year | Pop. | ±% |
|---|---|---|
| 2006 | 420 | — |
| 2014 | 529 | +26.0% |
| 2022 | 761 | +43.9% |
2006-2022: Census populations Source:
