= Alif Dhaalu Atoll =

Alifu Dhaalu Atoll
- Atoll
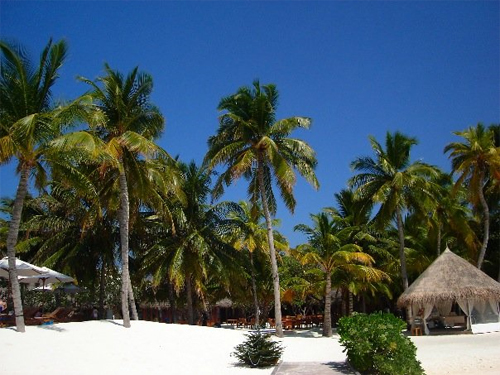
- Rangalifinolhu island in Ari Atoll or Alif Dhaalu Atoll where Conrad-Hilton operates a resort

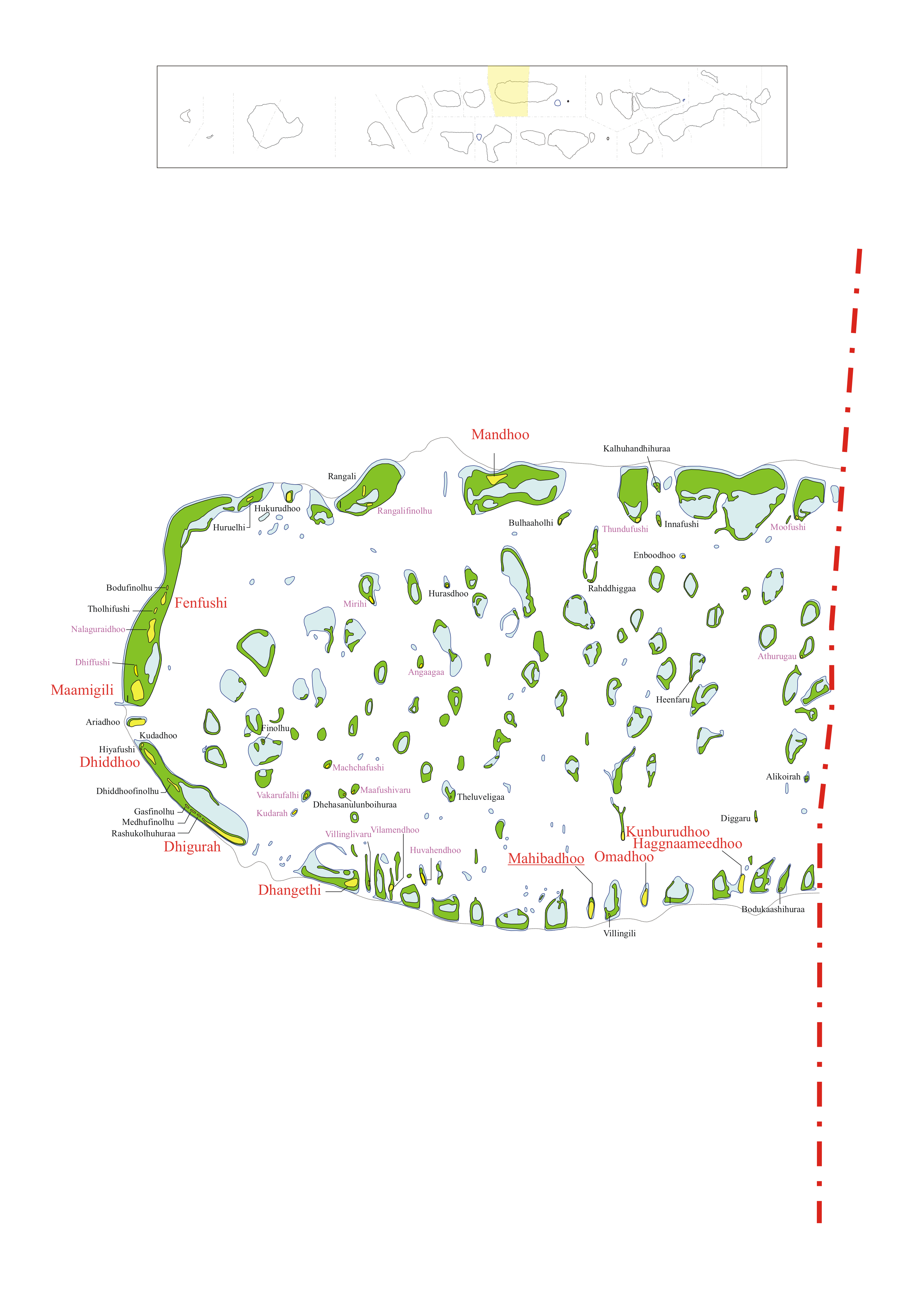

- Location of Alifu Dhaalu in Maldives
- Country: Maldives
- Corresponding geographic atoll(s): Ari Atholhu Dhekunuburi
- Location: 3.85° N and 72.83° E
- Capital: Mahibadhoo

Government
  - Atoll Chief: Mohamed Mahir

Population
  - Total: 8,145
- Letter code: I
- Dhivehi letter code: ADh (އދ)
  - Number of islands: 49
  - Inhabited islands: Dhangethi; Dhiddhoo; Dhigurah; Fenfushi; Hangnaameedhoo; Kunburudhoo; Maamingili; Mahibadhoo; Mandhoo; Omadhoo
  - Uninhabited islands: Alikoirah, Angaagaa*, Ariadhoo, Athurugau*, Bodufinolhu, Bodukaashihuraa, Bulhaaholhi, Dhehasanulunboihuraa, Dhiddhoofinolhu*, Dhiffushi*, Dhiggiri, Enboodhoo, Finolhu, Gasfinolhu, Heenfaru, Hiyafushi, Hukurudhoo, Hurasdhoo, Huruelhi*, Huvahendhoo*, Innafushi, Kalhuhandhihuraa, Kudadhoo, Kudarah*, Maafushivaru*, Machchafushi*, Medhufinolhu, Mirihi*, Moofushi*, Nalaguraidhoo*, Rahddhiggaa, Rangali, Rangalifinolhu*, Rashukolhuhuraa, Theluveligaa, Tholhifushi, Thudufushi*, Vakarufalhi*, Vilamendhoo*, Villingili, Villingilivaru*
- Resort islands(*), airports(¤) and industrial islands are also considered uninhabited.

Alifu Dhaalu Atoll (also known as Southern Ari Atoll or Ari Atholhu Dhekunuburi) is an administrative division of the Maldives.

The separation of Ari Atoll (formerly Alifu Atoll) on March 1, 1984, into a Northern and a Southern section formed the two most recent administrative divisions of the Maldives, namely Alifu Alifu Atoll and Alifu Dhaalu Atoll. Alifu Dhaalu Atoll lies south of the line between the channels of Himendhoo Dhekunukandu and Genburugau Kandu.

There is an ancient mosque in Fenfushi island having wooden decorated ceilings and lacquerwork panels.

Buddhist remains, including a stupa, have been found in Ariadhoo Island.

Whale sharks are year-round residents of Alif Dhaal Atoll.

== Geography ==
The South Ari Atoll administrative division consists of the southern part of the geographic or natural Ari Atoll (described as Southern Ari Atoll in this context to differentiate from the official name of the administrative division). The atoll consists of Inhabited Islands and Uninhabited Islands, a definition which includes resort islands, airport islands, and industrial islands.

=== Inhabited islands ===
Name	Population	Coordinates	Geographic Atoll/Island	Remarks
Dhangethi	713	3°36′27″N 72°57′19″E	Southern Ari Atoll	
Dhiddhoo	137	3°28′59″N 72°52′39″E	Southern Ari Atoll	
Dhigurah	529	3°31′50″N 72°55′33″E	Southern Ari Atoll	
Fenfushi	729	3°29′21″N 72°47′1″E	Southern Ari Atoll	
Hangnaameedhoo	481	3°50′57″N 72°57′18″E	Southern Ari Atoll	
Kunburudhoo	606	3°46′32″N 72°55′30″E	Southern Ari Atoll	
Maamigili	2,079	3°28′34″N 72°50′12″E	Southern Ari Atoll	
Mahibadhoo	1,939	3°45′25″N 72°58′9″E	Southern Ari Atoll	Capital of the South Ari Atoll Administrative Division
Mandhoo	295	3°41′52″N 72°42′34″E	Southern Ari Atoll	
Omadhoo	843	3°47′29″N 72°57′43″E	Southern Ari Atoll	

=== Resort islands ===
Resort islands are classified as Uninhabited Islands which have been converted to become resorts. The following are the resort islands, with the official name of the resort.

Name	Resort Name	Coordinates	Geographic Atoll	Remarks
Angaagau	Angaaga Island Resort and Spa	3°39′9″N 72°49′18″E	Southern Ari Atoll	
Athurugau	Diamonds Athuruga	3°53′13″N 72°48′58″E	Southern Ari Atoll	
Dhidhdhoofinolhu	LUX* South Ari Atoll	3°29′54″N 72°53′46″E	Southern Ari Atoll	
Dhiffushi	Holiday Island Resort	3°28′30″N 72°49′29″E	Southern Ari Atoll	
Huvahendhoo	Lily Beach Resort and Spa at Huvahendoo	3°39′13″N 72°57′13″E	Southern Ari Atoll	
Kuda Rah	Amaya Kuda Rah	3°34′26″N 72°54′38″E	Southern Ari Atoll	
Maafushivaru	Maafushivaru	3°36′28″N 72°54′1″E	Southern Ari Atoll	
Machchafushi	Centara Grand Island Resort and Spa	3°35′37″N 72°53′0″E	Southern Ari Atoll	
Mirihi	Mirihi Island Resort	3°37′9″N 72°46′49″E	Southern Ari Atoll	
Moofushi	Constance Moofushi	3°53′5″N 72°43′40″E	Southern Ari Atoll	
Nalaguraidhoo	Sun Island Resort	3°29′0″N 72°48′5″E	Southern Ari Atoll	
Rangalifinolhu	Conrad Maldives Rangali Island	3°36′58″N 72°42′59″E	Southern Ari Atoll	
Thundufushi	Diamonds Thudufushi	3°47′10″N 72°43′51″E	Southern Ari Atoll	
Vakarufalhi	Vakarufalhi Island Resort	3°34′42″N 72°54′7″E	Southern Ari Atoll	
Vilamendhoo	Vilamendhoo Island Resort	3°38′1″N 72°57′32″E	Southern Ari Atoll	
Villingilivaru	Ranveli Village	3°37′8″N 72°57′18″E	Southern Ari Atoll	
Huruelhi	Radisson Blu Maldives	unknown	Southern Ari Atoll	
