= List of islands of the Maldives =

Out of 1,192 islands of the Maldives, 187 are inhabited. They are listed by administrative division/atoll. The islands are divided into:

- Inhabited islands - those officially recognized as towns, villages, fishing, and farming communities with permanent human habitation. They all have an island office and island chiefs (councilor and "katheeb").
- Uninhabited islands - islands with no permanent human habitations. They are sometimes used for agricultural and industrial purposes, and more recently as tourist resorts and picnic islands. Some of these islands are valuable breeding grounds for various species of seabirds and sea turtles.
- Disappeared islands - islands which during recorded history, have been completely eroded away, claimed by the sea due to the sea level rise or assimilated by other islands. Some of these islands were previously inhabited and have been important in the history of the country. Some natural atolls are named after them (islands of Thiladhoo and Addu after which Thiladhunmati and Addu atoll are named respectively) while others are thought to have been the sites of the first settlements in the Maldives (Ihadhoo- meaning seen first and possibly the first settlement of the Maldives).

== Islands by area size ==
This list ranks the top 10 islands of the Maldives by area.

Some islands in the Maldives, although geographically one island, are divided into two administrative islands (for example, Isdhoo and Kalaidhoo in Laamu Atoll). For such cases, this list ranks the entire (combined) area of the geographical island.

Inland water bodies such as lakes and ponds are included in the total area.

Rank	Island	Atoll	Total area		Population (2022)
Rank	Island	Atoll	(km^{2})	(sq mi)	Population (2022)
1	Gamu-Maandhoo	Laamu	7.3	2.81	4,815 (Gan)
2	Hithadhoo	Seenu	5.4	2.08	13,759
3	Fuvahmulah	Gnaviyani	4.9	1.89	9,177
4	Hulhumalé	Kaafu	4.0	1.54	65,714
5	Hulhumeedhoo	Seenu	3.9	1.50	3,074 (combined)
6	Isdhoo-Kalaidhoo	Laamu	3.6	1.38	1,584 (combined)
7	Gan	Seenu	3.3	1.27	-
8	Hanimaadhoo	Haa Dhaalu	3.1	1.19	2,664
9	Hulhulé	Kaafu	3.0	1.15	-
10	Dhidhdhoo	Haa Alif	2.15	1.00	4800

Note: The combined area of Malé, Hulhulé and Hulhumalé exceeds 9 km^{2}, which surpasses the area of the largest natural island in the Maldives. However, these three together are considered to be a city, not an island.

== List of inhabited islands and districts by population ==
Atoll or city	Island	Population	
Atoll or city	Island	2022	2014
Malé (City)	Malé (Island): Henveiru (District); Galolhu (District); Machchangolhi (District); Maafannu (District)	137,433: 34,081; 28,600; 27,824; 46,928	125,969: 31,391; 25,788; 26,002; 42,788
Malé (City)	Hulhumalé (Island): Hulhumalé (District); Hulhule (District)	66,526: 65,724; 802	17,516: 17,149; 367
Malé (City)	Villimalé (District - Island)	6,754	7,988
Malé (City)	Gulhi Falhu (District - Island)	-	-
Malé (City)	Thilafushi (District - Island)	-	-
Malé (City)	Giraavarufalhu (District - Island)	-	-
Malé (City)	Harbours (District)	1,425	1,438
Addu Atoll - Seenu Atoll (Addu City)	Hithadhoo (Addu Atoll)	13,745	11,129
Addu Atoll - Seenu Atoll (Addu City)	Maradhoo (Island): Maradhoo (District); Maradhoo-Feydhoo (District)	3,943: 2,547; 1,396	3,602: 2,374; 1,228
Addu Atoll - Seenu Atoll (Addu City)	Feydhoo (Addu Atoll)	4,291	3,431
Addu Atoll - Seenu Atoll (Addu City)	Hulhumeedhoo (Island): Hulhudhoo (Addu Atoll) (District); Meedhoo (Addu Atoll) (District)	3,074: 1,182; 1,892	3,113: 1,242; 1,871
Alif Alif Atoll	Bodufolhudhoo	697	608
Alif Alif Atoll	Feridhoo	543	441
Alif Alif Atoll	Himandhoo	884	724
Alif Alif Atoll	Maalhos (Alif Alif Atoll)	516	434
Alif Alif Atoll	Mathiveri	874	662
Alif Alif Atoll	Rasdhoo	1,286	1,067
Alif Alif Atoll	Thoddoo	1,923	1,534
Alif Alif Atoll	Ukulhas	1,274	1,005
Dhaalu Atoll	Bandidhoo	630	793
Dhaalu Atoll	Hulhudheli	761	719
Dhaalu Atoll	Kudahuvadhoo	3,132	2,447
Dhaalu Atoll	Maaenboodhoo	675	621
Dhaalu Atoll	Meedhoo (Dhaalu Atoll)	1,113	929
Dhaalu Atoll	Rinbudhoo	317	277
Faafu Atoll	Bileddhoo	964	914
Faafu Atoll	Dharanboodhoo	454	400
Faafu Atoll	Feeali	922	839
Faafu Atoll	Magoodhoo (Faafu Atoll)	693	549
Faafu Atoll	Nilandhoo (Faafu Atoll)	1,825	1,663
Gaafu Alif Atoll	Dhaandhoo	1,045	1,077
Gaafu Alif Atoll	Dhevvadhoo	598	584
Gaafu Alif Atoll	Gemanafushi	1,307	1,223
Gaafu Alif Atoll	Kanduhulhudhoo	616	533
Gaafu Alif Atoll	Kolamaafushi	635	958
Gaafu Alif Atoll	Kondey	328	272
Gaafu Alif Atoll	Maamendhoo	1,197	1,137
Gaafu Alif Atoll	Nilandhoo (Gaafu Alif Atoll)	542	600
Gaafu Alif Atoll	Villingili	2,906	2,837
Gnaviyani Atoll	Fuvahmulah (City)	14,200	13,980
Haa Alif Atoll	Baarah	1,141	1,215
Haa Alif Atoll	Dhiddhoo (Haa Alif)	4,736	2,854
Haa Alif Atoll	Filladhoo	559	584
Haa Alif Atoll	Hoarafushi	1,831	1,826
Haa Alif Atoll	Ihavandhoo	2,866	2,575
Haa Alif Atoll	Kelaa	1,117	1,074
Haa Alif Atoll	Maarandhoo (Haa Alif)	667	671
Haa Alif Atoll	Mulhadhoo	286	230
Haa Alif Atoll	Muraidhoo	534	467
Haa Alif Atoll	Thakandhoo	279	354
Haa Alif Atoll	Thuraakunu	427	421
Haa Alif Atoll	Uligamu	400	383
Haa Alif Atoll	Utheemu	612	569
Haa Alif Atoll	Vashafaru	476	449
Haa Dhaalu Atoll	Finey	409	409
Haa Dhaalu Atoll	Hanimaadhoo	2,645	1,951
Haa Dhaalu Atoll	Hirimaradhoo	293	335
Haa Dhaalu Atoll	Kulhudhuffushi (City)	10,251	8,440
Haa Dhaalu Atoll	Kumundhoo	996	886
Haa Dhaalu Atoll	Kurinbi	492	463
Haa Dhaalu Atoll	Makunudhoo (Haa Dhaalu Atoll)	1,265	1,282
Haa Dhaalu Atoll	Naivaadhoo	495	417
Haa Dhaalu Atoll	Nellaidhoo	1,036	859
Haa Dhaalu Atoll	Neykurendhoo	641	743
Haa Dhaalu Atoll	Nolhivaramu	1,980	1,892
Haa Dhaalu Atoll	Nolhivaranfaru	1,255	1,081
Haa Dhaalu Atoll	Vaikaradhoo	776	783
Kaafu Atoll	Dhiffushi (Kaafu Atoll)	1,274	1,053
Kaafu Atoll	Gaafaru	1,289	1,066
Kaafu Atoll	Gulhi	976	912
Kaafu Atoll	Guraidhoo (Kaafu Atoll)	1,739	1,738
Kaafu Atoll	Himmafushi	2,015	1,725
Kaafu Atoll	Huraa	1,654	1,300
Kaafu Atoll	Kaashidhoo	2,450	1,865
Kaafu Atoll	Maafushi	4,499	3,025
Kaafu Atoll	Thulusdhoo	1,818	1,408
Lhaviyani Atoll	Hinnavaru	2,288	2,497
Lhaviyani Atoll	Kurendhoo	1,171	1,259
Lhaviyani Atoll	Naifaru	4,814	4,103
Lhaviyani Atoll	Olhuvelifushi	696	521
Meemu Atoll	Dhiggaru (Meemu Atoll)	1,096	984
Meemu Atoll	Kolhufushi	790	735
Meemu Atoll	Maduvvaree (Meemu Atoll)	318	369
Meemu Atoll	Mulah	1,423	1,275
Meemu Atoll	Muli	940	860
Meemu Atoll	Naalaafushi	430	424
Meemu Atoll	Raimmandhoo	170	112
Meemu Atoll	Veyvah	304	263
Vaavu Atoll	Felidhoo (Vaavu Atoll)	618	506
Vaavu Atoll	Fulidhoo	399	372
Vaavu Atoll	Keyodhoo (Vaavu Atoll)	642	675
Vaavu Atoll	Rakeedhoo	77	106
Vaavu Atoll	Thinadhoo (Vaavu Atoll)	259	152
Maldives (total)		515,122	402,071

== North Thiladhunmathi (HA) (Haa Alif Atoll) ==
=== Inhabited Islands ===
- Baarah
- Dhiddhoo (capital of Haa Alifu Atoll)
- Filladhoo
- Hoarafushi
- Ihavandhoo
- Kelaa
- Maarandhoo
- Mulhadhoo
- Muraidhoo
- Thakandhoo
- Thuraakunu
- Uligamu
- Utheemu
- Vashafaru

=== Uninhabited Islands ===
- Alidhoo
- Alidhuffarufinolhu
- Berinmadhoo
- Beenaafushi
- Gaafushi
- Gaamathikulhudhoo
- Gallandhoo
- Govvaafushi
- Hathifushi
- Huraa
- Huvahandhoo
- Innafinolhu
- Kudafinolhu
- Maafahi
- Maafinolhu
- Maarandhooffaruffinolhu
- Madulu
- Manafaru
- Matheerah
- Medhafushi
- Mulidhoo
- Naridhoo
- Umaraiffinolhu
- Ungulifinolhu
- Vagaaru
- Velifinolhu

=== Disappeared Islands ===
- Gasthirifinolhu
- Gudhanfushi
- Thiladhoo (now part of Dhiddhoo)
- Thinadhoo

== South Thiladhunmathi (HDh) (Haa Dhaalu Atoll) ==
=== Inhabited Islands ===
- Hanimaadhoo
- Finey
- Naivaadhoo
- Nolhivaranfaru
- Nellaidhoo
- Nolhivaram
- Kurinbi
- Kulhudhuffushi City (capital of Haa Dhaalu Atoll and that of the Mathi-Uthuru Province)
- Kumundhoo
- Neykurendhoo
- Vaikaradhoo
- Makunudhoo
- Hirimaradhoo

=== Uninhabited Islands ===
- Bodunaagoashi
- Bolissafaru
- Dafaru Fasgandu
- Dhorukanduhuraa
- Faridhoo
- Fenboahuraa
- Hirinaidhoo
- Hondaafushi
- Hondaidhoo
- Innafushi
- Kanamana
- Kattalafushi
- Kaylakunu
- Kudamuraidhoo
- Kudanaagoashi
- Kurinbi
- Maavaidhoo (previously inhabited)
- Muiri
- Rasfushi
- Ruffushi
- Vaikaramuraidhoo
- Veligandu
- Dhipparafushi
- Kunburudhoo (previously inhabited)
- Theefaridhoo

=== Disappeared Islands ===
- Bileddhoo

== North Miladhunmadulu (Funadhuffaaru) (Sh) (Shaviyani Atoll) ==
=== Inhabited Islands ===
- Bileffahi
- Feevah
- Feydhoo
- Foakaidhoo
- Funadhoo (capital of Shaviyani Atoll)
- Goidhoo
- Kanditheemu
- Komandoo
- Lhaimagu
- Maaungoodhoo
- Maroshi
- Milandhoo
- Narudhoo
- Noomaraa

=== Uninhabited Islands ===
- Bis Huraa
- Dhigu Rah
- Dhiguvelldhoo
- Dholhiyadhoo
- Dholhiyadhoo Kudarah
- Dhonveli-huraa
- Ekasdhoo
- Eriyadhoo
- Farukolhu
- Fushifaru
- Firunbaidhoo
- Gaakoshinbi
- Gonaafarufinolhu
- Gallaidhoo
- Hirubadhoo
- Hurasfaruhuraa
- Kabaalifaru
- Keekimimi
- Kudafaruboduhuraa
- kudafaruhuraagandu
- kudafaruhuraa
- Killissafaruhuraa
- Kudalhaimendhoo
- Madidhoo
- Madikurendhdhoo
- Maleehuraa
- Mathikomandoo
- Maakandoodhoo
- Medhurah
- Medhukunburudhoo
- Migoodhoo
- Naainfarufinolhu
- Naalaahuraa
- Nalandhoo
- Naruibudhoo
- Neyo
- thabeyhuraa
- Vagaru

=== Disappeared Islands ===
- Gallaidhookudarah
- Gonaafushi
- Killisfaru'rahgandu

== South Miladhunmadulu (N) (Noonu Atoll) ==
=== Inhabited Islands ===
- Foddhoo
- Henbadhoo
- Holhudhoo
- Kendhikulhudhoo
- Kudafari
- Landhoo
- Lhohi
- Maafaru
- Maalhendhoo
- Magoodhoo
- Manadhoo (capital of Noonu Atoll)
- Miladhoo
- Velidhoo

=== Uninhabited Islands ===
- Badadhidhdhoo
- Bodufushi
- Bodulhaimendhoo
- Bomasdhoo
- Burehifasdhoo
- Dheefuram
- Dhelibehuraa
- Dhekenanfaru
- Dhigurah
- Dhonaerikandoodhoo
- Ekulhivaru
- Farumuli
- Felivaru
- Fodhidhipparu
- Fushivelavaru
- Gallaidhoofushi
- Gemendhoo
- Goanbilivaadhoo
- Hulhumeedhoo
- Huivani
- Hulhudhdhoo
- Huvadhumaavattaru
- Iguraidhoo
- Kuddarah
- Kadimmahuraa
- Kalaidhoo
- Karimma
- Kedhivaru
- Koalaa
- Kolhufushi
- Kudafunafaru
- Kudafushi
- Kunnamaloa
- Kuramaadhoo
- Kuredhivaru
- Loafaru
- Maafunafaru
- Maakurandhoo
- Maakanaafushi
- Maavelavaru
- Medhafushi
- Medhufaru
- Maafarudhoo
- Minaavaru
- Orimasvaru
- Orivaru
- Raafushi
- Raalulaakolhu
- Randheli
- Thaburudhoo
- Thaburudhuffushi
- Tholhendhoo
- Thoshigadukolhu
- Vattaru
- Vavathi
- Vihafarufinolhu

=== Disappeared Islands ===
- Kulhimila (unconfirmed)
- Kudavattaru (unconfirmed)
- Koalaa

== North Maalhosmadulu (R) (Raa Atoll) ==
=== Inhabited Islands ===
- Alifushi
- Angolhitheemu
- Fainu
- Hulhudhuffaaru
- Inguraidhoo
- Innamaadhoo
- Dhuvaafaru
- Kinolhas
- Maakurathu
- Maduvvaree
- Meedhoo (vice capital of Raa Atoll)
- Rasgetheemu
- Rasmaadhoo
- Ungoofaaru (capital of Raa Atoll)
- Vaadhoo

=== Uninhabited Islands ===
- Aarah
- Arilundhoo
- Badaveri
- Bodufarufinolhu
- Bodufenmaaenboodhoo
- Bodufushi
- Boduhaiykodi
- Boduhuraa
- Ekurufushi
- Etthingili
- Dhigali
- Dhoragali
- Dheburidheythereyvaadhoo
- Dhikkurendhdhoo
- Dhinnaafushi
- Faarafushi
- Fasmendhoo
- Fenfushi
- Filaidhoo
- Fuggiri
- Furaveri
- Gaaudoodhoo
- Giraavaru
- Goyyafaru
- Goiymaru
- Guboshi
- Hiraveri
- Hulhudhoo
- Huruvalhi
- Huruvalhigaathura
- Ifuru
- Kandholhudhoo
- Kaddogadu
- Kandhoomeehungelhaanbugali
- Kothaifaru
- Kottafaru
- Kottefaru
- Kudafushi
- Kudahaiykodi
- Kudakurathu
- Kudalhosgiri
- kudafenmaaenboodhoo
- Kudathulhaadhoo
- Kukulhudhoo
- Kuroshigiri
- Lhaanbugali
- Lhaanbugau
- Lhohi
- Liboakandhoo
- Lundhufushi
- Maafaru
- Maamigili
- Maamunagaufinolhu
- Maanenfushi
- Maashigiri
- Madivaafaru
- Mahidhoo
- Meedhupparu
- Minaadhoo
- Muravandhoo
- Mullaafushi
- Neyo
- Thaavathaa
- Ugulu
- Uthurumaafaru
- Vaffushihuraa
- Vandhoo
- Veyvah
- Viligili
- Wakkaru

=== Disappeared Islands ===
- Boduhuraa
- Ethigandujehihuraa
- Fasgandufarufinolhu
- Furaverumeehungemaafaru
- Gaaviligiligaathurah
- Inguraidhookudadhiffushi
- Kurredhupparu

== South Maalhosmadulu (B) (Baa Atoll) ==
=== Inhabited Islands ===
- Dharavandhoo
- Dhonfanu
- Eydhafushi (capital of Baa Atoll)
- Fehendhoo
- Fulhadhoo
- Goidhoo
- Hithaadhoo
- Kamadhoo
- Kendhoo
- Kihaadhoo
- Kudarikilu
- Maalhos
- Thulhaadhoo

=== Uninhabited Islands ===
- Ahivaffushi
- Aidhoo
- Anhenunfushi
- Bathalaa
- Boadhaafusheefinolhu
- Bodufinolhu
- Boifushi
- Dhakendhoo
- Dhandhoo
- Dhigufaruvinagandu
- Dhoogandufinolhu
- Dhunikolhu
- Enboodhoo
- Fareedhaafinolhu
- Fehenfushi
- Finolhas
- Fonimagoodhoo
- Fulhadhoorah kairi finonolhu
- Funadhoo
- Gaagandufaruhuraa
- Gaavillingili
- Gemendhoo
- Hanifaru
- Hanifarurah
- Hibalhidhoo
- Hirundhoo
- Horubadhoo
- Hulhudhoo
- Innafushi
- Kanifusheegaathu finolhu
- Kanifushi
- Kashidhoogiri
- Kaashidhoo
- Kaashidhuffaru
- Keyodhoo
- Kihaadhufaru
- Kihavah-huravalhi
- Kudadhoo
- Kunfunadhoo
- Landaagiraavaru
- Lunfares
- Maaddoo
- Maafushi
- Maamaduvvari
- Maarikilu
- Madhirivaadhoo
- Medhufinolhu
- Mendhoo
- Milaidhoo
- Miriandhoo
- Muddhoo
- Muthaafushi
- Nibiligaa
- Olhugiri
- Rahkairifinolhu
- Thiladhoo
- Ufuligiri
- Undoodhoo
- Vakkaru
- Velavaru
- Velivarufinolhu
- Veyofushee
- Villingili
- Vinaneih-faruhuraa
- Voavah

=== Disappeared Islands ===
- Dhorukandu'dhekunuhuraa
- Dhorukandu'uthuruhuraa
- Goidhoohuraa
- Hithadhoohuraa
- Hithadookudarah
- Kalhunaiboli
- Lhavadhookandurah

== Faadhippolhu (Lh) (Lhaviyani Atoll) ==
=== Inhabited Islands ===
- Hinnavaru
- Kurendhoo
- Maafilaafushi
- Naifaru (capital of Lhaviyani Atoll)
- Olhuvelifushi
- Ookolhufinolhu

=== Uninhabited Islands ===
- Aligau
- Bahurukabeeru
- Bodhuhuraa
- Bodufinolhu
- Bodufaahuraa
- Bodugaahuraa
- Dhidhdhoo
- Dhirubaafushi
- Diffushi
- Faadhoo
- Fainuaadham-Huraa
- Fehigili
- Felivaru (capital of the Uthuru Province)
- Fushifaru
- Gaaerifaru
- Govvaafushi
- Hadoolaafushi
- Hiriyadhoo
- Hudhufushi
- Huravalhi
- Kalhumanjehuraa
- Kalhuoiyfinolhu
- Kanifushi
- Kanuhuraa
- Komandoo
- Kudadhoo
- Kuredhdhoo
- Lhohi
- Lhossalafushi
- Maabinhuraa
- Maavaafushi
- Madhiriguraidhoo
- Madivaru
- Maduvvari
- Maidhoo
- Mayyafushi
- Medhadhihuraa
- Medhafushi
- Meedhaahuraa
- Mey-yyaafushi
- Musleygihuraa
- Raiyruhhuraa
- Selhlhifushi
- Thilamaafushi
- Varihuraa
- Vavvaru
- Veligadu
- Veyvah
- Vihafarufinolhu

=== Disappeared Islands ===
- Aligauhuraagandu
- Bahurukabiru
- Bulhalaafushi
- Ruhelhifushi
- Olhugiri

== Malé (K) Atoll (Kaafu Atoll) ==
=== Inhabited Islands ===
- Dhiffushi
- Gaafaru
- Gulhi
- Guraidhoo
- Himmafushi
- Hulhumalé
- Huraa
- Kaashidhoo
- Malé (capital of the Maldives)
- Maafushi (capital of the Medhu-Uthuru Province)
- Thulusdhoo (capital of Kaafu Atoll)
- Villimalé (formerly known as Villingili)

=== Uninhabited Islands ===
- Aarah
- Akirifushi
- Asdhoo
- Baros
- Bandos
- Biyaadhoo
- Bodubandos
- Bodufinolhu
- Boduhithi
- Boduhuraa
- Bolifushi
- Dhigufinolhu
- Dhoonidhoo
- Ehrruh-haa
- Enboodhoo
- Enboodhoofinolhu
- Eriyadhoo
- Farukolhufushi
- Feydhoofinolhu
- Fihalhohi
- Funadhoo
- Furan-nafushi
- Gasfinolhu
- Giraavaru
- Girifushi
- Gulheegaathuhuraa
- Helengeli
- Henbadhoo
- Hulhulé
- Huraagandu
- Ihuru
- Ithaafushi 2017 Reclaimed Island in south male atoll
- Kagi
- Kalhuhuraa
- Kandoomaafushi
- Kanduoih-giri
- Kanifinolhu
- Kanuhuraa
- Kodhipparu
- Kudabandos
- Kudafinolhu
- Kudahithi
- Kudahuraa
- Lankanfinolhu
- Lankanfushi
- Lhohifushi
- Lhosfushi
- Maadhoo
- Madivaru
- Mahaanaélhihuraa
- Makunudhoo
- Makunufushi
- Maniyafushi
- Medhufinolhu
- Meerufenfushi
- Nakachchaafushi
- Olhahali
- Olhuveli
- Oligandufinolhu
- Ran-naalhi
- Rasfari
- Thanburudhoo
- Thilafushi
- Thulhaagiri
- Vaadhoo
- Vaagali
- Vabbinfaru
- Vabboahuraa
- Vammaafushi
- Velassaru
- Velifaru
- Veliganduhuraa
- Vihamanaafushi
- Villingilimathidhahuraa
- Villingilivau
- Ziyaaraiffushi

=== Disappeared Islands ===
- Bisfushi
- Farukolhufushi(now part of hulhumale)
- Gaadhoo (now part of Hulhulé)
- Gaamaadhoo (now part of Himmafushi)
- Gulhifalhurah
- Kaashidhookudarah
- Kaddhipparu
- Kuda Malé (now part of Malé)
- Kudavattaru
- Kuredhivinahuraagandu
- Oiidhuni
- Dhabilalhidhoo

== North Ari Atoll (AA) (Alif Alif Atoll) ==
=== Inhabited Islands ===
- Bodufolhudhoo
- Feridhoo
- Himandhoo
- Maalhos
- Mathiveri
- Rasdhoo (capital of Alif Alif Atoll)
- Thoddoo
- Ukulhas
- Fesdhoo

=== Uninhabited Islands ===
- Alikoirah
- Bathalaa
- Beyrumadivaru
- Dhin-nolhufinolhu
- Ellaidhoo
- Etheramadivaru
- Fusfinolhu
- Fushi
- Gaagandu
- Gaathufushi
- Gangehi
- Halaveli
- Kandholhudhoo
- Kudafolhudhoo
- Kuramathi
- Maagaa
- Maayyafushi
- Madivarufinolhu
- Madoogali
- Mathivereefinolhu
- Meerufenfushi
- Mushimasgali
- Rasdhoo madivaru
- Velidhoo
- Veligandu
- Vihamaafaru

=== Disappeared Islands ===
- Bathalaamaagau
- Faanumadugau
- Fushifarurah
- Gaahuraafussari
- Gonaagau
- Huraadhoo
- Kubuladhi
- Kudafalhufushi
- Kurolhi
- Orimasfushi
- Ukulhasgaathufushi

== South Ari Atoll (ADh) (Alif Dhaal Atoll) ==
=== Inhabited Islands ===
- Dhangethi
- Dhiddhoo
- Dhigurah
- Fenfushi
- Haggnaameedhoo
- Kunburudhoo
- Maamingili
- Mahibadhoo (capital of Alif Dhaal Atoll)
- Mandhoo
- Omadhoo

=== Uninhabited Islands ===
- Alikoirah
- Angaagaa
- Athurugau
- Bodufinolhu
- Bodukaashihuraa
- Bulhaaholhi
- Dhehasanulunboihuraa
- Dhiddhoofinolhu
- Dhiffushi
- Dhiggiri
- Enboodhoo
- Finolhu
- Gasfinolhu
- Heenfaru
- Hiyafushi
- Hukurudhoo
- Hurasdhoo
- Huruelhi
- Huvahendhoo
- Innafushi
- Kalhuhandhihuraa
- Kudadhoo
- Kudarah
- Maafushivaru
- Machchafushi
- Medhufinolhu
- Mirihi
- Moofushi
- Nalaguraidhoo
- Rahddhiggaa
- Rangali
- Rangalifinolhu
- Rashukolhuhuraa
- Theluveligaa
- Tholhifushi
- Thundufushi
- Vakarufalhi
- Vilamendhoo
- Villingili
- Villinglivaru

=== Disappeared Islands ===
- Aafinolhu
- Aufushi
- Faruhukuruvalhi
- Hithifushi
- Huraadhoo
- Kalaafushi
- Kudadhoo
- Medhafushi
- Theyofulhihuraa

== Felidhu Atoll (V) (Vaavu Atoll) ==
=== Inhabited Islands ===
- Felidhoo (capital of Vaavu Atoll)
- Fulidhoo
- Keyodhoo
- Rakeedhoo
- Thinadhoo

=== Uninhabited Islands ===
- Aarah
- Alimathaa
- Anbaraa
- Bodumohoraa
- Dhiggiri
- Foiytheyobodufushi
- Fussfaruhuraa
- Hingaahuraa
- Hulhidhoo
- Kuda-anbaraa
- Kudhiboli
- Kunawashi
- Maafussaru
- Medhugiri
- Thunduhuraa
- Raggadu
- Ruhhurihuraa
- Vashugiri
- Vattaru'rah

=== Disappeared Islands ===
- Aahuraa
- Hinagaakalhi
- Kahanbufushi
- Kalhuhuraa
- Kolhudhuffushi
- Kudadhiggaru
- Kudafussfaruhuraa

== Mulakatholhu (M) (Meemu Atoll) ==
=== Inhabited Islands ===
- Mulak
- Maduvvaree
- Dhiggaru
- Kolhufushi
- Muli (capital of Meemu Atoll)
- Naalaafushi
- Raimmandhoo
- Veyvah

=== Uninhabited Islands ===
- Boahuraa
- Dhekunuboduveli
- Dhiththudi
- Erruh-huraa
- Fenboafinolhu
- Fenfuraaveli
- Gaahuraa
- Gasveli
- Gongalu Huraa
- Haafushi
- Hakuraahuraa
- Hurasveli
- Kekuraalhuveli
- Kudadhigandu
- Kurali
- Kudausfushi
- Maahuraa
- Maalhaveli
- Maausfushi
- Medhufushi
- Raabandhihuraa
- Seedhihuraa
- Seedhihuraaveligandu
- Thuvaru
- Uthuruboduveli
- Veriheybe

=== Disappeared Islands ===
- Boduvela
- Dhonveliganduhuraa
- Vah'huruvalhi

== North Nilandhe Atoll (F) (Faafu Atoll) ==
=== Inhabited Islands ===
- Bileddhoo
- Dharanboodhoo
- Feeali
- Magoodhoo
- Nilandhoo (capital of Faafu Atoll)

=== Uninhabited Islands ===
- Badidhiffusheefinolhu
- Dhiguvarufinolhu
- Enbulufushi
- Faanuvaahuraa
- Filitheyo
- Himithi
- Jinnathugau
- Kandoomoonufushi
- Kudafarifinolhu
- Maafushi
- Maavaruhuraa
- Madivaruhuraa
- Makunueri
- Minimasgali
- Villingilivarufinolhu
- Voshimasfalhuhuraa

=== Disappeared Islands ===
- Boduhuraa
- Dhiguvaru
- Feealeehuraa
- Hukeraa
- Kudafari
- Madivarufinolhu

== South Nilandhe Atoll (Dh) (Dhaalu Atoll) ==
=== Inhabited Islands ===
- Bandidhoo
- Hulhudheli
- Kudahuvadhoo (capital of Dhaalu Atoll)
- Maaenboodhoo
- Meedhoo
- Rinbudhoo
- Vaanee

=== Uninhabited Islands ===
- Aloofushi
- Ayyakaloahuraa
- Bodufushi
- Bulhalafushi
- Dhebaidhoo
- Dhoores
- Enboodhoofushi
- Faandhoo
- Gaadhiffushi
- Gemendhoo
- Hiriyanfushi
- Hudhufusheefinolhu
- Hulhuvehi
- Issari
- Kandinma
- Kanneiyfaru
- Kedhigandu
- Kiraidhoo
- Lhohi
- Maadheli
- Maafushi
- Maagau
- Maléfaru
- Meedhuffushi
- Minimasgali
- Naibukaloabodufushi
- Olhufushi
- Olhuveli
- Thilabolhufushi
- Thinhuraa
- Uddhoo
- Vaanee
- Valla
- Vallalhohi
- Velavaroo (Velavaru)
- Vonmuli

=== Disappeared Islands ===
- Maadhelihuraa
- Madivaru
- Madivaruhuraa
- Naibukaloakudafushi

== Kolhumadulu (Th) (Thaa Atoll) ==
=== Inhabited Islands ===
- Burunee
- Vilufushi
- Madifushi
- Dhiyamingili
- Guraidhoo
- Gaadhiffushi
- Thimarafushi
- Veymandoo (capital of Thaa Atoll)
- Kinbidhoo
- Omadhoo
- Hirilandhoo
- Kandoodhoo
- Vandhoo

=== Uninhabited Islands ===
- Bodufinolhu
- Bodurehaa
- Dhiffushi
- Dhonanfushi
- Dhururehaa
- Ekuruffushi
- Elaa
- Fenfushi
- Fenmeerufushi
- Fonaddoo
- Fondhoo
- Fonidhaani
- Fushi
- Gaalee
- Gaathurehaa
- Hathifushi
- Hiriyanfushi
- Hodelifushi
- Hulhiyanfushi
- Kaaddoo
- Kadufushi
- Kafidhoo
- Kakolhas
- Kalhudheyfushi
- Kalhufahalafushi
- Kandaru
- Kani
- Kanimeedhoo
- Kolhufushi-1
- Kolhufushi-2
- Kudadhoo
- Kudakaaddoo
- Kudakibidhoo
- Kurandhuvaru
- Kuredhifushi
- Lhavaddoo
- Maagulhi
- Maalefushi
- Mathidhoo
- Medhafushi
- Olhudhiyafushi
- Olhufushi
- Olhufushi-finolhu
- Olhugiri
- Ruhththibirah
- Thinkolhufushi
- Ufuriyaa
- Usfushi
- Vanbadhi

=== Disappeared Islands ===
- Filaagandu
- Kandoodhookuraa
- Keyovah'rah
- Kolhuvanbadhi
- Kudaburunee
- Kudadhiyanmigili

== Hadhdhunmathi (L) (Laamu Atoll) ==
=== Inhabited Islands ===
- Dhanbidhoo
- Fonadhoo (capital of Laamu Atoll)
- Gan (capital of the Mathi-Dhekunu Province)
- Hithadhoo
- Isdhoo
- Kunahandhoo
- Maabaidhoo
- Maamendhoo
- Maavah
- Mundoo
- Kalaidhoo

=== Uninhabited Islands ===
- Athahédha
- Berasdhoo
- Bileitheyrahaa
- Bodufenrahaa
- Bodufinolhu
- Boduhuraa
- Bodumaabulhali
- Bokaiffushi
- Dhekunu Vinagandu
- Faés
- Fonagaadhoo
- Fushi
- Gaadhoo
- Gasfinolhu
- Guraidhoo
- Hanhushi
- Hedha
- Holhurahaa
- Hulhimendhoo
- Hulhisdhoo
- Hulhiyandhoo
- Kaddhoo
- Kalhuhuraa
- Kalhaidhoo
- Kandaru
- Kudafares
- Kudafushi
- Kudahuraa
- Kudakalhaidhoo
- Kukurahaa
- Maakaulhuveli
- Maandhoo
- Maaveshi
- Mahakanfushi
- Medhafushi
- Medhoo
- Medhufinolhu
- Medhuvinagandu
- Munyafushi
- Olhutholhu
- Olhuveli
- Thunburi
- Thundudhoshufushi Nolhoo/Thundudhoshufinolhu
- Uthuruvinagandu
- Uvadhevifushi
- Vadinolhu
- Veligandufinolhu
- Ziyaaraiffushi

=== Disappeared Islands ===
- Aahuraa
- Aarahaa
- Boduboahuraa
- Bodumahigulhi
- Dhurudhandaaikandaagerah
- Hassanbey'rah
- Ihadhoo
- Kerendhoo
- Kokrahaaoiyythaafinolhu
- Kudamahigulhi
- Sathugalu
- Vadinolhuhuraa

== North Huvadhu Atoll (GA) (Gaafu Alif Atoll) ==
=== Inhabited Islands ===
- Dhaandhoo
- Dhevvadhoo
- Gemanafushi
- Kanduhulhudhoo
- Kolamaafushi
- Kondey
- Maamendhoo
- Nilandhoo
- Villingili (capital of Gaafu Alif Atoll)

=== Uninhabited Islands ===
- Araigaiththaa
- Baavandhoo
- Baberaahuttaa
- Bakeiththaa
- Beyruhuttaa
- Beyrumaddoo
- Bihuréhaa
- Boaddoo
- Bodéhuttaa
- Budhiyahuttaa
- Dhevvalaabadhoo
- Dhevvamaagalaa
- Dhigémaahuttaa
- Dhigudhoo
- Dhigurah
- Dhiyadhoo
- Dhonhuseenahuttaa
- Falhumaafushi
- Falhuverrehaa
- Farudhulhudhoo
- Fénéhuttaa
- Fenrahaa
- Fenrahaahuttaa
- Funadhoovillingili
- Funadhoo
- Funamaddoo
- Galamadhoo
- Giyadhoo
- Haagevillaa
- Hadahaa
- Hagedhoo
- Heenamaagalaa
- Hirihuttaa
- Hithaadhoo
- Hithaadhoogalaa
- Hulhimendhoo
- Hunadhoo
- Hurendhoo
- Hunadhoo
- Idimaa
- Innaréhaa
- Kalhehuttaa
- Kalhudhiréhaa
- Kanduvillingili
- Keesseyréhaa
- Kendheraa
- Koduhuttaa
- Kondeymatheelaabadhoo
- Kondeyvillingili
- Kudalafari
- Kuddoo
- Kudhébondeyyo
- Kudhéfehélaa
- Kudhéhuttaa
- Kureddhoo
- Lhossaa
- Maadhiguvaru
- Maaféhélaa
- Maagehuttaa
- Maakanaarataa
- Maamutaa
- Maarandhoo
- Maaréhaa
- Mahaddhoo
- Maththidhoo
- Maththuréhaa
- Médhuburiyaa
- Médhuhuttaa
- Medhuréhaa
- Melaimu
- Meradhoo
- Minimensaa
- Munaagala
- Munandhoo
- Odagallaa
- Raaverrehaa
- Rinbidhoo
- Thinrukéréhaa
- Uhéréhaa
- Viligillaa
- Vodamulaa

=== Disappeared Islands ===
- Aligalehuttaa
- Falhukolhurataa
- Galuréhaa
- Giyadhoo
- Giyadhoogaathuinnaratuhuttaa
- Havvaadhiyekuyyaakéeranahthedhinerehaa
- Kakadiherehuttaa
- Odafuttaa
- Parehulhedhoo
- Thabaidhoo
- Thiladhurehaa
- Vagaathugalfuttaa
- Viligili

== South Huvadhu Atoll (GDh) (Gaafu Dhaalu Atoll) ==
=== Inhabited Islands ===
- Fares-Maathodaa
- Fiyoaree
- Gadhdhoo
- Hoandeddhoo
- Madaveli
- Nadellaa
- Rathafandhoo
- Thinadhoo (capital of Gaafu Dhaalu Atoll and of the Medhu-Dhekunu Province)
- Vaadhoo

=== Uninhabited Islands ===
- Aakiraahuttaa
- Athihuttaa
- Badéfodiyaa
- Barahuttaa
- Baulhagallaa
- Bodehuttaa
- Bodérehaa
- Bolimathaidhoo
- Dhékanbaa
- Dhérékudhéhaa
- Dhigérehaa
- Dhigulaabadhoo
- Dhinmanaa
- Dhiyanigilllaa
- Dhonigallaa
- Dhoonirehaa
- Ehéhuttaa
- Ekélondaa
- Faahuttaa
- Faanahuttaa
- Faathiyéhuttaa
- Faréhulhudhoo
- Farukoduhuttaa
- Fatéfandhoo
- Femunaidhoo
- Fenevenehuttaa
- Féreythavilingillaa
- Fonahigillaa
- Gaazeeraa
- Gan
- Gehémaagalaa
- Gehévalégalaa
- Golhaallaa
- Haadhoo
- Hadahaahuttaa
- Hakandhoo
- Handaidhoo
- Havoddaa
- Havodigalaa
- Hevaahulhudhoo
- Hiyanigilihuttaa
- Hoothodéyaa
- Hulheddhoo
- Hunigondiréhaa
- Isdhoo
- Kaadeddhoo
- Kaafaraataa
- Kaafénaa
- Kaalhéhutta
- Kaalhéhuttaa
- Kaashidhoo
- Kadahalagalaa
- Kadévaaréhaa
- Kalhaidhoo
- Kalhéfalaa
- Kalhehigillaa
- Kalhéhuttaa
- Kalhéréhaa
- Kanandhoo
- Kandeddhoo
- Kannigilla
- Kautihulhudhoo
- Kélaihuttaa
- Keraminthaa
- Kereddhoo
- Kéyhuvadhoo
- Kodaanahuttaa
- Kodédhoo
- Kodégalaa
- Koduhutigallaa
- Kodurataa
- Konontaa
- Kudhé-ehivakaa
- Kudhéhulheddhoo
- Kudhélifadhoo
- Kudhérataa
- Kudhukélaihuttaa
- Kurikeymaahuttaa
- Laihaa
- Lifadhoo
- Lonudhoo
- Lonudhoohuttaa
- Maadhoo
- Maaéhivakaa
- Maagodiréhaa
- Maahéraa
- Maahutigallaa
- Maarehaa
- Maavaarulaa
- Maaveddhoo
- Maguddhoo
- Mainaadhoo
- Mallaaréhaa
- Mariyankoyya Rataa
- Mathaidhoo
- Mathihuttaa
- Mathikera-nanahuththaa
- Meehunthibenehuttaa
- Menthandhoo
- Meragihuttaa
- Meyragilla
- Mudhimaahuttaa
- Odavarrehaa
- Oinigillaa
- Olhimuntaa
- Olhurataa
- Raabadaaféhéreehataa
- Rahadhoo
- Ralhéodagallaa
- Reddhahuttaa
- Rodhevarrehaa
- Thelehuttaa
- Thinehuttaa
- Ukurihuttaa
- Ulégalaa
- Vairéyaadhoo
- Vatavarrehaa
- Veraavillingillaa
- Villigalaa

=== Disappeared Islands ===
- Boduréhaabokkoyyaa
- Hevanaréhaa
- Isdhuvaa
- Maaodagalaa
- Keyhuvadhoo
- Kudakokeréhaa
- Kudhéhaadhu
- Uheréhaa
- Aydeedodasistamodasofdafodas

Barahuttaa

== Fuvahmulah (Gn) (Gnaviyani Atoll) ==
=== Inhabited Islands ===
- Fuvahmulah (capital of Gnaviyani Atoll):

Taking into consideration the geography of the island along with its size and population, the 8 wards of Fuvahmulah are officially recognised as administrative divisions which act as the replacement for islands in other atolls. They are Dhadimago, Diguvāndo, Hōdhado, Mādhado, Miskimmago, Funādo, Mālegan, Dūndigan. For each ward a chief ('Katheeb') was appointed as in charge of the day-to-day affairs of the respective ward and held accountable for an Atoll chief. According to the Decentralisation Act 2010 an island council too have to be elected for each division of the island. There was formerly a ninth ward named Dhashokubaa which was merged with Miskimmago.

== Addu Atoll (Seenu Atoll) ==
=== Inhabited Islands ===
- Hithadhoo (capital of Addu City and of the Dhekunu Province)
- Maradhoo
- Maradhoo-Feydhoo (part of Maradhoo island)
- Feydhoo
- Hulhudhoo (Addu)
- Meedhoo (Addu)

=== Uninhabited Islands ===
- Aboohéra - (within or part of Hithadhoo)
- Boda Hajara
- Bodahéraganda
- Dhigihéra
- Dhiyarudi
- Fahikédéhéraganda
- Gan
- Gaukendi - (within or part of Hithadhoo)
- Geskalhahéra
- Gomahera
- Hankedé
- Hankedé Hajara
- Herathera
- Hikahera
- Ismehela Hera
- Kafathalhaa Héra
- Kabboahera
- Kandihera
- Kédévaahéra
- Koahera
- Kandihéréganda
- Koattay
- Maahera
- Maamendhoo -(within or part of Hithadhoo)
- Madihéra
- Mulikédé
- Odessau-boda - (within or part of Hithadhoo)
- Odessau-kudhu - (within or part of Hithadhoo)
- Rasgedhara - (within or part of Hithadhoo)
- Rujjehera - (within or part of Hithadhoo)
- Savaaheli
- Vashahéra
- Villingili
- Naanu

=== Disappeared Islands ===
- Aminaamanike Heraganda
- Feylihikkikudhumaahéra
- Geskalhahéra-kudakalhahéra
- Thinruh Heragada

== See also ==
- List of islands in the Indian Ocean
