= Maafilaafushi =

- Inhabited island
- Location in Maldives
- Coordinates: 05°21′45″N 73°25′11″E
- Country: Maldives
- Administrative atoll: Lhaviyani Atoll
- Distance to Malé: 133.25 km (82.80 mi)

Dimensions
  - Length: 2.300 km (1.429 mi)
  - Width: 0.300 km (0.186 mi)

Population
  - Total: 42
- Time zone: UTC+05:00 (MST)

Maafilaafushi (Dhivehi: މާފިލާފުށި) is one of the uninhabited islands of Lhaviyani Atoll in the Maldives.

== History ==
Maafilaafushi was inhabited during the 17th Century and the local population is believed to have resettled in Naifaru. Ruins of a Mosque and some tombstones can be found from this period. The island once served as the capital of the separatist Kingdom of Boduthiladhunmathi. Mohamed Rannabadeyri Thakuru with the help of Adhi Raja of Cannanore attacked Male' and tried to overthrow the kingdom of Ibrahim Kalaafaanu (Sultan Ibrahim III 1585–1609). However being unable to take control of the capital Male' they fled to Faadhippolhu where Mohamed Rannabadeyri controlled the northern atolls of the Maldives until he was overthrown by Sultan Muhammad Imaduddin I (1620–1648).

The island of Maafilaafushi was resettled in the 1980s in order to relieve the lack of land availability in Malé, and ease the dense population in Naifaru and Hinnavaru islands of the same atoll. However, only a few families moved to Maafilaafushi, leading to the population of the island being shifted to other inhabited islands in the 2010s, the island is now an MNDF post.

== Geography ==
Maafilaafushi is located on the Eastern rim of the atoll between Kanifushi and Kurendhoo. The island is quite long and stretches 1.5 miles North to South. The reef which the island is located on is quite rocky, and 4 islands are located on this reef, which are Meedhaahuraa, Maafilaafushi, Medhafushi, and Maakoa. Maakoa, located in the south-western end of the reef contains one of the largest Mangrove Lakes in Maldives, and Flamingos are known to breed in these mangroves.
