= Veyvah =

Veyvah may refer to the following places:

- Veyvah, Lhaviyani Atoll, Maldives
- Veyvah (Meemu Atoll), Maldives
- Veyvah, Raa Atoll, Maldives
