= Nilandhoo =

Nilandhoo may refer to the following places in the Maldives:

- Nilandhoo (Faafu Atoll)
- Nilandhoo (Gaafu Alif Atoll)
