= Vattaru-dhekunu Kandu =

Water channel between two atolls

Vattaru-dhekunu Kandu is the channel between Meemu Atoll and Vattaru Falhu Atoll of the Maldives.
