= Vattaru-uthuru Kandu =

Water channel of India

Vattaru-uthuru Kandu is the channel between the tip of the Meemu Atoll Raiymandhoo 'Muli' and the reef of 'Fohtheufalhu' of the Maldives.
