= Meemu =

Meemu may refer to:

- Meemu Atoll, an administrative division of the Maldives.
- Meemu, the tenth consonant of the Thaana abugaida used in Dhivehi.
