= Maduvvari =

Maduvvari as a place name may refer to:

- Maduvvaree (Lhaviyani Atoll) (Republic of Maldives)
- Maduvvari (Meemu Atoll) (Republic of Maldives)
- Maduvvari (Raa Atoll) (Republic of Maldives)
