= Federico Cabitza =

Italian computer scientist

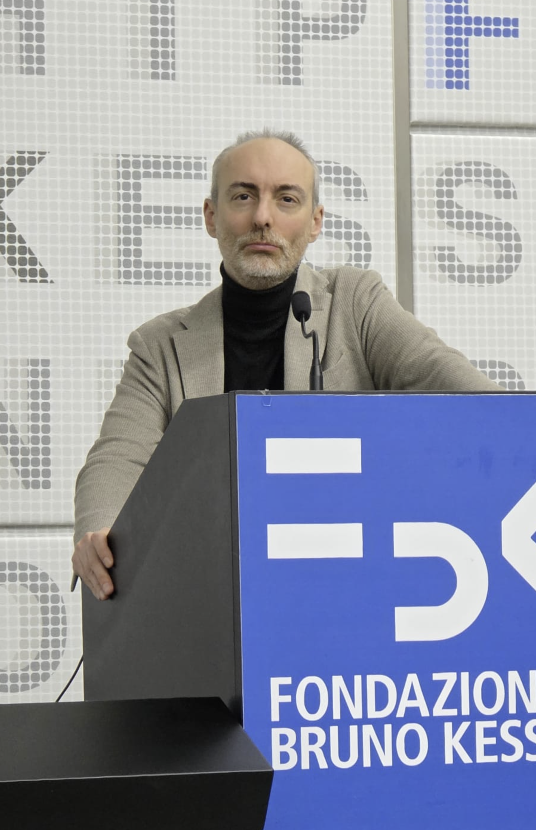
Federico Cabitza at FBK (Trento, Italy), February 2026.

Federico Cabitza is an Italian computer scientist and full professor at the University of Milano-Bicocca. His research concerns the design and evaluation of artificial-intelligence and decision-support systems in organizational settings, particularly healthcare. Since 2026, he has served as director of the Digital Health & Wellbeing Center at Fondazione Bruno Kessler (FBK) in Trento.

== Education and academic career ==
Cabitza obtained a degree in computer engineering in 2001 and a PhD in computer science in 2007. He is a full professor at the University of Milano-Bicocca, where he teaches human–computer interaction, human–AI interaction, information systems, and decision support. He heads the Laboratory of Models for Uncertainty, Decisions and Interactions and directs the local node of the CINI national laboratory "Computer Science and Society".

== Research ==
Cabitza's research focuses on how people interact and collaborate with artificial-intelligence systems and on the design and evaluation of AI-based decision support, especially in clinical settings. He has authored more than 300 research publications in international conference proceedings, books, and scientific journals."Federico Cabitza". Fondazione Bruno Kessler – Digital Health & Wellbeing Center. He has authored more than 300 research publications in international conference proceedings, books, and scientific journals. Since 2020, he has been included in the Stanford/Elsevier citation-impact list of the top 2% of researchers worldwide. With philosopher Luciano Floridi, he wrote the book Intelligenza artificiale: l'uso delle nuove macchine, published by Bompiani in 2021. The book examines the place of human beings in a society increasingly shaped by AI and was reviewed in Pandora Rivista.

== Editorial service ==
Cabitza previously served as an associate editor of the International Journal of Medical Informatics and is currently a member of its Senior Advisory Board. He is also Section Editor-in-Chief for the Learning section of Machine Learning and Knowledge Extraction.

== Public engagement ==
Cabitza has contributed to public discussion of artificial intelligence through interviews and explanatory initiatives. In interviews and public lectures, he has discussed the risks of overreliance on automated decisions, the possible loss of professional skills, and the effects of AI on work and power relationships. In 2024, he co-authored an evolving glossary of artificial-intelligence terminology for Corriere della Sera.

== Publications ==
Selected publications spanning human–AI collaboration, trustworthy AI, medical informatics, and interaction quality include:

- Cabitza, F., Campagner, A., & Sconfienza, L. M. (2020). As if sand were stone. New concepts and metrics to probe the ground on which to build trustable AI. BMC Medical Informatics and Decision Making, 20, 219. https://doi.org/10.1186/s12911-020-01224-9
- Cabitza, F., Campagner, A., & Simone, C. (2021). The need to move away from agential-AI: Empirical investigations, useful concepts and open issues. International Journal of Human-Computer Studies, 155, 102696. https://doi.org/10.1016/j.ijhcs.2021.102696
- Cabitza, F., Campagner, A., & Sconfienza, L. M. (2021). Studying human-AI collaboration protocols: the case of the Kasparov’s law in radiological double reading. Health Information Science and Systems, 9(1), 8. https://doi.org/10.1007/s13755-021-00138-8
- Marconi, L., & Cabitza, F. (2025). Show and tell: A critical review on robustness and uncertainty for a more responsible medical AI. International Journal of Medical Informatics, 202, 105970. https://doi.org/10.1016/j.ijmedinf.2025.105970
- Natali, C., Marconi, L., Dias Duran, L. D., & Cabitza, F. (2025). AI-induced Deskilling in Medicine: A Mixed-Method Review and Research Agenda for Healthcare and Beyond. Artificial Intelligence Review, 58(11), 356. https://doi.org/10.1007/s10462-025-11352-1
- Marconi, L., Longo, L., & Cabitza, F. (2026). Assessing Interaction Quality in Human–AI Dialogue: An Integrative Review and Multi-Layer Framework for Conversational Agents. Machine Learning and Knowledge Extraction, 8(2), 28. https://doi.org/10.3390/make8020028
