= Minimasgali =

Minimasgali may refer to the following places in the Maldives:

- Minimasgali (Dhaalu Atoll)
- Minimasgali (Faafu Atoll)
