= Magoodhoo =

Magoodhoo may refer to the following places in the Maldives:

- Magoodhoo (Faafu Atoll)
- Magoodhoo (Noonu Atoll)
