= Lhaviyani =

Lhaviyani may have more than one meaning:

- Lhaviyani Atoll, an administrative division of the Maldives.
- Lhaviyani, the sixth consonant of the Thaana abugaida used in Dhivehi.
