= Faafu =

Faafu may refer to:

- Faafu Atoll, an administrative division of the Maldives.
- Faafu, the 11th consonant of the Thaana abugida used in Dhivehi.
