= Ariadhoo Kandu =

Channel between Alif Atoll and Faafu Atoll of the Maldives

Ariadhoo Kandu is the channel between Alif Atoll and Faafu Atoll located in the Maldives.
