= Madifushi (Meemu Atoll) =

Madifushi މަޑިފުށި
- Abandoned Island
- Location in Maldives
- Coordinates: 3°4′52.93″N 73°38′18.24″E
- Country: Maldives
- Administrative atoll: Meemu Atoll
- Distance to Malé: 121.82 km (75.70 mi)

Dimensions
  - Length: 0.600 km (0.373 mi)
  - Width: 0.260 km (0.162 mi)

Population (2014)
  - Total: 0
- Time zone: UTC+05:00 (MST)

Madifushi (Dhivehi: މަޑިފުށި) is one of the abandoned islands of Meemu Atoll.

== Geography ==
The island is 121.82 km (76 mi; 66 nmi) south of the country's capital, Malé.

== Tsunami ==
M. Madifushi was severely impacted by the 2004 Boxing Day Tsunami, so much so that the people who were previously living in the Island were displaced to Maamigili, an island in Alif Dhaalu Atoll.
