= Medhufinolhu =

Medhufinolhu as a place name may refer to:

- Medhufinolhu (Alif Dhaal Atoll) (Republic of Maldives)
- Medhufinolhu (Baa Atol) (Republic of Maldives)
- Medhufinolhu (Kaafu Atol) (Republic of Maldives)
- Medhufinolhu (Laamu Atol) (Republic of Maldives)
- Medhufinolhu (Meemu Atoll) (Republic of Maldives)
