= Innafushi =

Innafushi as a place name may refer to:

- Innafushi (Alif Dhaal Atoll) (Republic of Maldives)
- Innafushi (Baa Atoll) (Republic of Maldives)
- Innafushi (Haa Dhaalu Atoll) (Republic of Maldives)
