= Dharanboodhoo =

Dharanboodhoo ދަރަނބޫދޫ
- Inhabited island
- Location in Maldives
- Coordinates: 03°03′48″N 72°55′40″E
- Country: Maldives
- Geographic atoll: North Nilandhe Atoll
- Administrative atoll: Faafu Atoll
- Distance to Malé: 138.88 km (86.30 mi)

Dimensions
  - Length: 1.300 km (0.808 mi)
  - Width: 0.400 km (0.249 mi)

Population (2022)
  - Total: 455
- Time zone: UTC+05:00 (MST)

Dharanboodhoo (Dhivehi: ދަރަނބޫދޫ) is one of the inhabited islands of Faafu Atoll.

== Geography ==
The island is 138.88 km (86 mi; 75 nmi) southwest of the country's capital, Malé.

== Demography ==
Historical population
Year	Pop.	±%
2006	279	—
2014	384	+37.6%
2022	455	+18.5%
2006-2022: Census populations Source:
