= Kurinbi =

Kurinbi ކުރިނބީ
- Inhabited island
- Location in Maldives
- Coordinates: 06°40′00″N 72°59′44″E
- Country: Maldives
- Geographic atoll: Thiladhummathi Atoll
- Administrative atoll: Haa Dhaalu Atoll
- Distance to Malé: 281.32 km (174.80 mi)

Dimensions
  - Length: 0.800 km (0.497 mi)
  - Width: 0.540 km (0.336 mi)

Population (2022)
  - Total: 780
- Time zone: UTC+05:00 (MST)

Kurinbi (Dhivehi: ކުރިނބީ) is one of the inhabited islands of Haa Dhaalu Atoll administrative division and geographically part of Thiladhumathi Atoll in the north of the Maldives.

== History ==
The island was severely damaged by the great cyclone of 1821 that hit the northern atolls of the Maldives.

== Geography ==
The island is 281.32 km (175 mi; 152 nmi) north of the country's capital, Malé.

== Demography ==
Historical population
Year	Pop.	±%
2006	430	—
2014	448	+4.2%
2022	492	+9.8%
2006-2014-2022: Census populations Source:
