= Naalaafushi =

Naalaafushi ނާލާފުށި
- Inhabited island
- Location in Maldives
- Coordinates: 02°53′45″N 73°34′38″E
- Country: Maldives
- Administrative atoll: Meemu Atoll
- Distance to Malé: 141.68 km (88.04 mi)

Dimensions
  - Length: 0.875 km (0.544 mi)
  - Width: 0.150 km (0.093 mi)

Population (2022)
  - Total: 430
- Time zone: UTC+05:00 (MST)

Naalaafushi (Dhivehi: ނާލާފުށި) is one of the inhabited islands of Meemu Atoll.

== History ==
=== 2004 tsunami and aftermath ===
Following the 2004 tsunami, 390 of the 465 population of the island were left without habitable homes. Within a few weeks of the disaster, the United Nations Development Programme had transported 190 tons of construction material to the island and intended to have all the residents rehoused by the middle of 2005.

== Geography ==
The island is 141.68 km (88 mi; 77 nmi) south of the country's capital, Malé. The land area of the island is 9.8 ha (24 acres) in 2018. The island was described as having an area of 8.9 ha (22 acres) in 2007.

== Demography ==
Historical population
Year	Pop.	±%
2006	321	—
2014	406	+26.5%
2022	430	+5.9%
2006-2022: Census populations Source:

== Healthcare ==
Naalaafushi has a health center with a doctor and 3 nurses and a pharmacy.

== Transport ==
Construction of the island's harbour was contracted to MTCC in 2014.
