= Kumundhoo =

Kumundhoo ކުމުންދޫ
- Inhabited island
- Location in Maldives
- Coordinates: 06°34′24″N 73°02′59″E
- Country: Maldives
- Geographic atoll: Thiladhummathi Atoll
- Administrative atoll: Haa Dhaalu Atoll
- Distance to Malé: 270.03 km (167.79 mi)

Dimensions
  - Length: 2.350 km (1.460 mi)
  - Width: 1.150 km (0.715 mi)

Population (2022)
  - Total: 997
- Time zone: UTC+05:00 (MST)

Kumundhoo (Dhivehi: ކުމުންދޫ) is one of the inhabited islands of Haa Dhaalu Atoll administrative division and geographically part of Thiladhummathi Atoll in the north of the Maldives.

== History ==
An archaeological site from the pre-Islamic Buddhist era is found on the island. It is in the form of a stone circle known locally as Us-Kunna, possibly the remains of an ancient buddhist stupa.

Demonstrations in Kumundhoo in 2006 was among a long line of demonstrations against the government injustice and negligence of the outer islands by the government.

== Geography ==
The island is 270.03 km (168 mi; 146 nmi) north of the country's capital, Malé.

== Demography ==
Historical population
Year	Pop.	±%
2006	889	—
2014	859	−3.4%
2022	997	+16.1%
2006-2014-2022: Census populations Source:
