= Kudafari =

- Inhabited island
- Location in Maldives
- Coordinates: 05°52′47″N 73°23′58″E
- Country: Maldives
- Geographic atoll: Miladhummadulhu Atoll
- Administrative atoll: Southern Miladhunmadulu
- Distance to Malé: 188.87 km (117.36 mi)

Dimensions
  - Length: 0.680 km (0.423 mi)
  - Width: 0.430 km (0.267 mi)

Population (2022)
  - Total: 628
- Time zone: UTC+05:00 (MST)

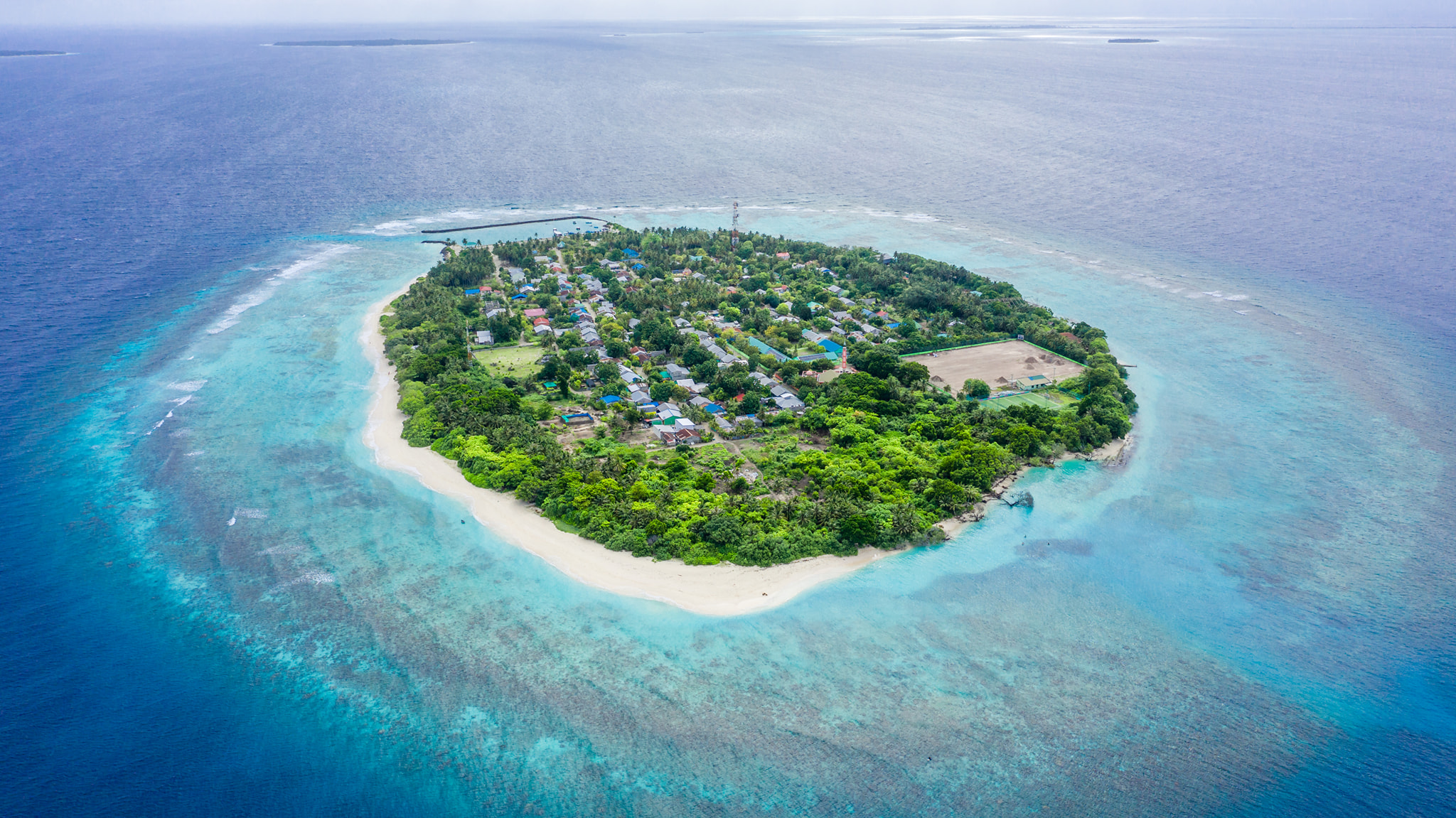
Kudafari island

Kudafari (Dhivehi: ކުޑަފަރި) is one of the inhabited islands of Noonu Atoll.

== History ==
The first inhabitants of Kudafari were Black African slaves that were brought to the Maldives by Sultan Hassan III (infamously known as Hadi Hassan Rasgefaanu). Slaves were mostly brought during that period for work such as shipbuilding and toddy tapping. They were housed in the Galolhu district of Malé at a place known as Baburun Koshi. They were freed in Malé and subsequently settled in Kudafari after the Sultan freed them and allowed them to settle in an island of their choosing. According to the late historian Lutfi writing in Faiythoora, the Africans in Kudafari were brought in the 14th century from the slave markets of Makkah. The origin of these slaves are speculated to be either modern day Tanzania or Djibouti, although an exact country remains unknown. The last slave transaction in Maldives happened during the 1830s as the Arab Slave Trade lasted longer than its Trans Atlantic counterpart. The islanders living today are descendants of these people, with most of them having distinct african features and usually being taller in stature than average Maldivians. Some even inter-married local women from nearby islands. Slaves settled peacefully in Maldives and usually married into the then lower caste of Maldivian society. N.Kudafari and AA.Feridhoo are two known communities of African descent in Maldives. Similar communities exist in neighbouring Sri Lanka and India.

== Geography ==
The island is 188.87 km (117 mi; 102 nmi) north of the country's capital, Malé. Kudafari's land is flat. (Note: Calculated from length data (DEM 3 ") from Viewfinder Panoramas. Full algorithm available here.) The highest point on the island is 15 metres (49 ft) above the sea level. 0.5 km (0.31 mi) from north to south and 0.7 km (0.43 mi) from east to west.

The average temperature is 25 °C (77 °F). The hottest month is April, at 27 °C (81 °F), and the coldest is January, at 26 °C (79 °F). The average rainfall is 1,944 millimeters per year. The wettest month is August, with 322 mm (12.7 in) of rain, and the driest is February, with 40 mm (1.6 in).

=== Ecology ===
"The 'Integrated Multi-Tropical Aquaculture Project' was envisaged to initiate a community-led cause to revive coral reefs. Being from a small island such as Kudafari, we see the effects of climate change every day. But despite the odds, the project makes one believe in a future that we all can achieve."

== Demography ==
Historical population
| Year | Pop. | ±% |
|---|---|---|
| 2006 | 373 | — |
| 2014 | 415 | +11.3% |
| 2022 | 628 | +51.3% |
2006-2014-2022: Census populations Source:

== Education ==
Kudafaree has a school.

=== Smart School Programme ===
As part of the government's programme to improve the standard of education in the country, President Mohamed Nasheed launched the Smart School Programme. The Kudafari School was inaugurated as the first Smart School under the programme.

Smart schools make use of information and communication technology and multimedia resources in the classrooms, in order to cater to the needs of all students of different academic levels.
