= Olhuvelifushi =

Olhuvelifushi އޮޅުވެލިފުށި
- Inhabited island
- Location in Maldives
- Coordinates: 05°16′39″N 73°36′21″E
- Country: Maldives
- Administrative atoll: Lhaviyani Atoll
- Distance to Malé: 122.36 km (76.03 mi)

Dimensions
  - Length: 1.200 km (0.746 mi)
  - Width: 0.225 km (0.140 mi)

Population (2022)
  - Total: 703
- Time zone: UTC+05:00 (MST)

Olhuvelifushi (Dhivehi: އޮޅުވެލިފުށި) is one of the inhabited islands of Lhaviyani Atoll.

== Geography ==
The island is 122.36 km (76 mi; 66 nmi) north of the country's capital, Malé.

== Demography ==
Historical population
Year	Pop.	±%
2006	294	—
2014	500	+70.1%
2022	703	+40.6%
2006-2022: Census populations Source:
