= University of Milano-Bicocca =

Public university in Milan, Italy

Coordinates: 45°30′52″N 9°12′48″E

- Università degli Studi di Milano-Bicocca
- Motto: Audentes fortuna iuvat
- Motto in English: Fortune favors the bold
- Type: Public
- Established: 10 June 1998
- Affiliations: BioGeM
- Rector: Prof. Marco Emilio Orlandi
- Students: 33,752 (2017/18)
- Location: Milan, Monza and Bergamo, Italy
- Campus: Urban
- Sporting affiliations: CUS Milano
- Website: en.unimib.it

The University of Milano-Bicocca (Italian: Università degli Studi di Milano-Bicocca, UNIMIB) is a public university located in Milan, Italy, providing undergraduate, graduate and post-graduate education. Established in 1998, it was ranked by the Times Higher Education 2014 ranking of the best 100 Universities under 50 years old as number 21 worldwide and first in Italy. It was created to reduce University of Milan's overload.

== History ==
The University of Milano-Bicocca has its origins from the splitting of the University of Milan, which with about 90,000 students in the 1990s was becoming overcrowded. A large area in the north of Milan, Bicocca, was chosen as the location for the new university. This area was occupied by the Pirelli industrial complex until the 1980s and the new campus was part of a larger urban renewal project. The university was officially established on 10 June 1998.

Milan-Bicocca is a multidisciplinary university which offers a wide range of academic programs in different disciplinary fields: Economics, Informatics, Statistics, Law, Education, Sociology, Medicine and Surgery, Mathematics, Natural Sciences, Physics and Astrophysics, Chemistry, Computer Sciences, Biotechnology and Psychology.

== Campus ==
The University of Milano-Bicocca is located in an area on the northern outskirts of Milan, which was occupied by the Pirelli industrial complex until the late 1980s. The industrial area has been redesigned by architect Vittorio Gregotti into an urban complex, including the University of Milano-Bicocca's research laboratories and student residence halls.

=== Medical schools ===
The Italian language medical course of the Faculty of Medicine of the University of Milano-Bicocca is held in Monza.

The English language medical course of the Faculty of Medicine of the University of Milano-Bicocca is held at the Pope John XXIII Hospital in Bergamo.

== Organization ==
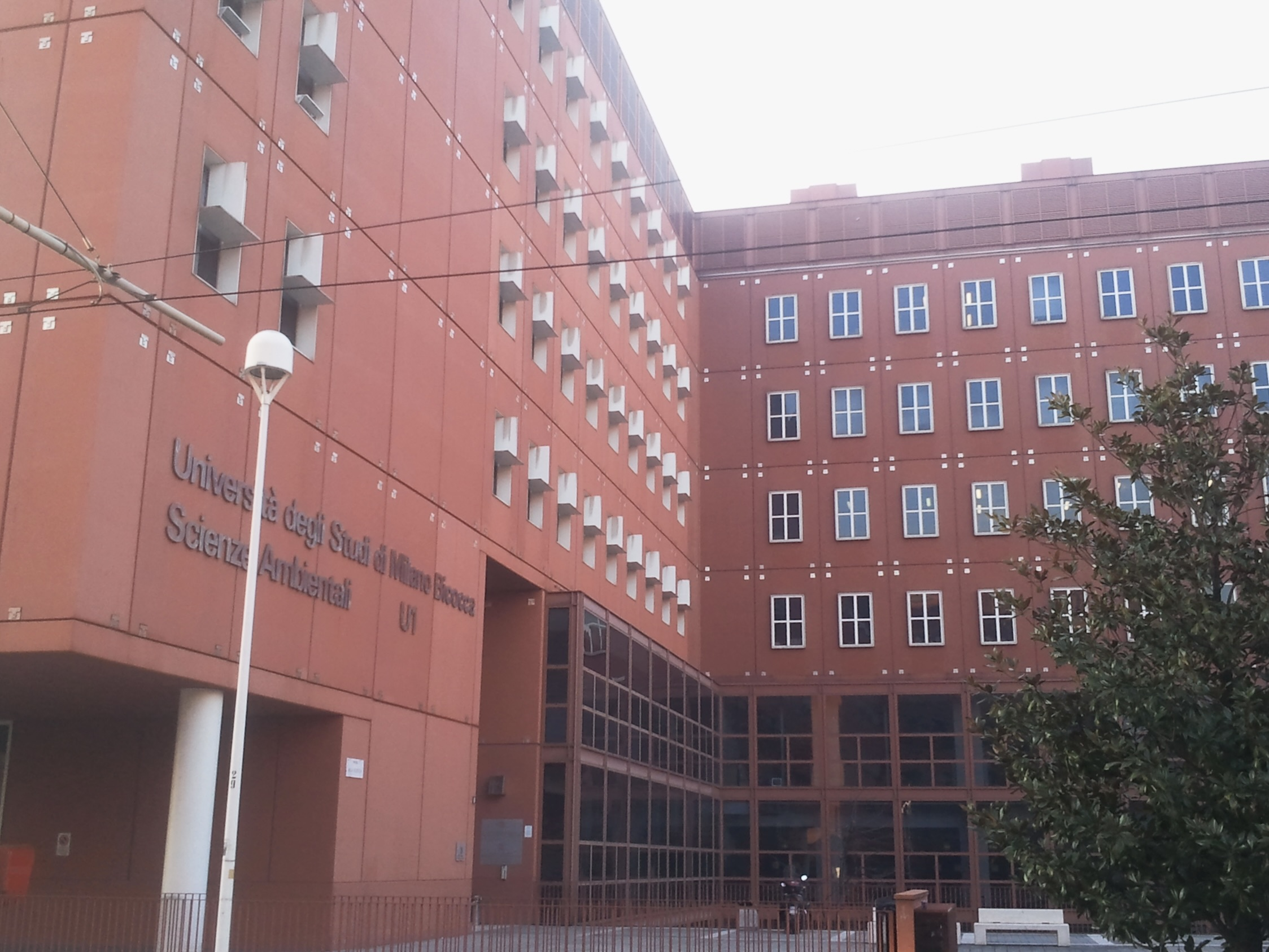

There are fourteen Departments and two Schools at the University of Milano-Bicocca:

- Department of Economics Management and Statistics
- Department of Business and Law
- Department of Statistics and Quantitative Methods
  - School of Economics
- Department of Biotechnology and Biosciences
- Department of Physics
- Department of Informatics, System and Communication
- Department of Mathematics and its Applications
- Department of Materials Science
- Department of Earth and Environmental Sciences
  - School of Science
- Department of Law
- Department of Medicine and Surgery
- Department of Psychology
- Department of Human Sciences for Education
- Department of Sociology and Social Research

The number of students at the university has grown steadily since it opened: in its first academic year there were 15,300 students, which had risen to 27,481 in 2003-2004 and by 2005-2006 there were over 30,000. In 2023 the number of students is almost 40,000.

== Research Centre in the Maldives ==
The university's Marine Research and Higher Education (MaRHE) Centre was opened in 2011 in Magoodhoo, Faafu Atoll in the Maldives. An article in the Maldives Independent noted that no Maldivian has graduated from the university in the fifteen years since the opening of the Centre. This is in part due to the university requiring students to fulfil an upper-intermediate Italian language course, without the possibility of reading prerequisite or lower-level courses. Furthermore, very few Maldivians have been included as co-authors on research papers by the centre.

== Rankings ==
University rankings

Global – Overall
- ARWU World: 301–400 (2024)
- QS World: =542 (2026)
- THE World: 351–400 (2025)

== See also ==
- ESDP-Network
- List of Italian universities
- Milan
- University of Milan
- Pope John XXIII
