= Komandoo (Lhaviyani Atoll) =

- resort island
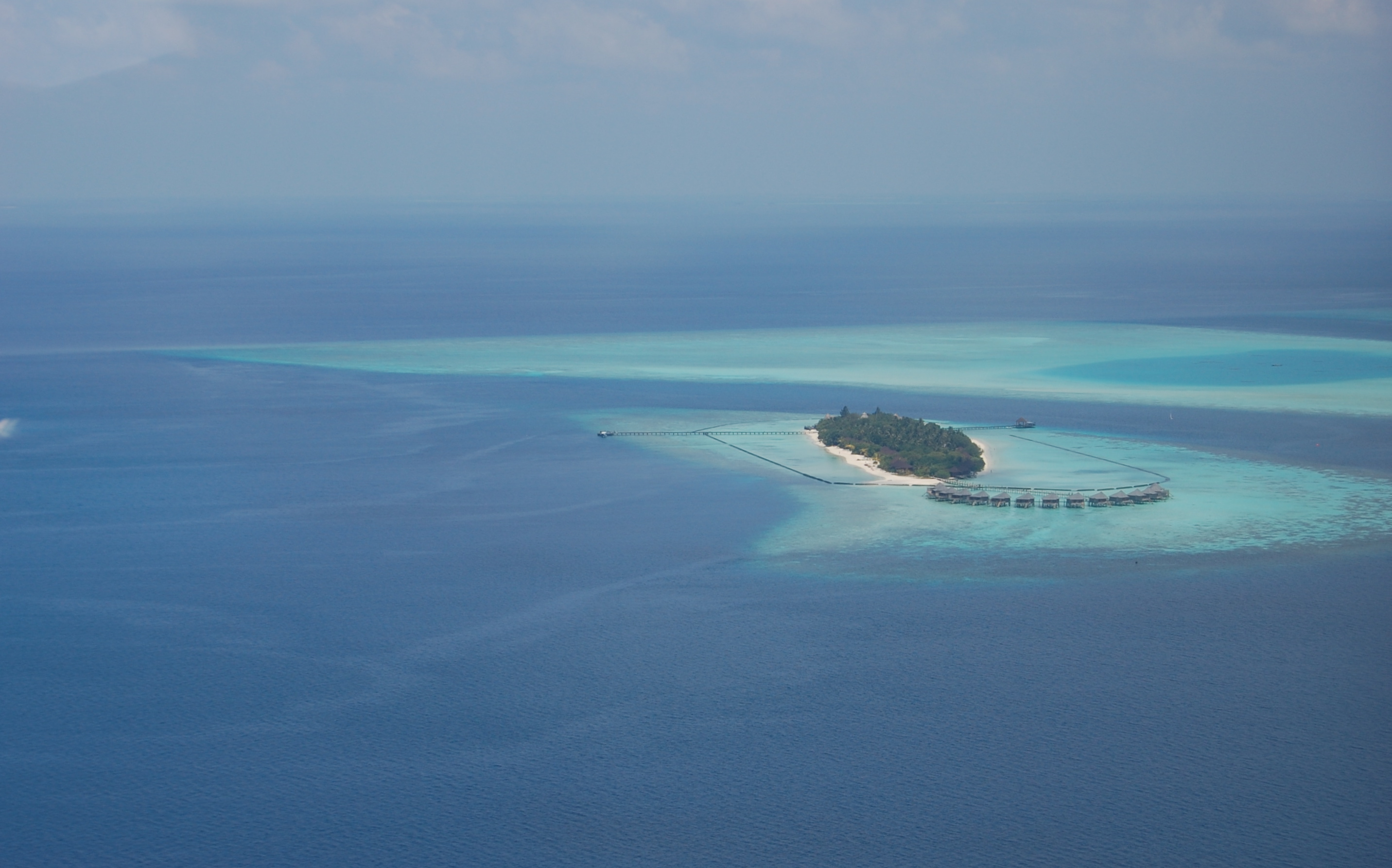

- Location in Maldives
- Coordinates: 05°29′38.37″N 73°25′27.19″E
- Country: Maldives
- Administrative atoll: Lhaviyani Atoll
- Distance to Malé: 145.48 km (90.40 mi)

Dimensions
  - Length: 0.450 km (0.280 mi)
  - Width: 0.123 km (0.076 mi)
- Time zone: UTC+05:00 (MST)

Komandoo is one of the resort islands of the Lhaviyani Atoll in the Maldives. The hotel is officially rated four stars and accommodates a maximum of 130 guests in 65 beach and ocean villas.
