= Nellaidhoo =

Nellaidhoo ނެއްލައިދޫ
- Inhabited island
- Location in Maldives
- Coordinates: 06°43′00″N 72°56′44″E
- Country: Maldives
- Geographic atoll: Thiladhummathi Atoll
- Administrative atoll: Haa Dhaalu Atoll
- Distance to Malé: 287.89 km (178.89 mi)

Dimensions
  - Length: 0.780 km (0.485 mi)
  - Width: 0.480 km (0.298 mi)

Population (2022)
  - Total: 1,038
- Time zone: UTC+05:00 (MST)

Nellaidhoo (Dhivehi: ނެއްލައިދޫ) is one of the inhabited islands of Haa Dhaalu Atoll administrative division and geographically part of Thiladhummathi Atoll in the north of the Maldives.

== Geography ==
The island is 287.89 km (179 mi; 155 nmi) north of the country's capital, Malé.

=== Environment ===
On 8 December 1821, an extremely strong cyclone hit Nellaidhoo and many other islands in northern Maldives, causing severe damage. In 2006 the government of Maldives listed Nellaidhoo as one of the islands under significant threat from sea level rise due to global warming. The government planned to relocate the population to larger islands with more facilities and better protection against rising sea levels. On 6 September 2006, the residents of the island protested outside the island office as their opinion was not consulted before considering the relocation.

== Demography ==
Historical population
Year	Pop.	±%
2006	717	—
2014	827	+15.3%
2022	1,038	+25.5%
2006–2014–2022: Census populations Source:

== Economy ==
Nellaidhoo is historically famous for fishing. However, fishing has decreased in importance. The younger generation, especially, engage more with tourism. Many people are involved in the construction industry. Women play a key role on the island, looking after children and doing work such as thatch weaving and coir rope making. Nowadays making snacks and selling is also common work for the women.

== Sport ==
Football and Bashi, the traditional Maldivian sport, are the most popular sports on the island. Netball and volleyball are also played, although they are less common. Nellaidhoo has a proud sporting history, having won the H.Dh. Atoll Inter-School Football Tournament, known as the Kulhudhuffushi Bodukaleyfanu Cup, in 1993, as well as the Football Association of Maldives (FAM) H.Dh. Atoll Tournament in 2001 and 2002. The Nellaidhoo Council also organizes the annual Council Cup Football Tournament, which brings together local teams and promotes football within the community. Among women, handball has gained significant popularity in recent years, with the Nellaidhoo Council Cup Handball Tournament being held regularly by the Nellaidhoo Council to encourage participation and foster the development of the sport.
