= Neykurendhoo =

Neykurendhoo ނޭކުރެންދޫ
- Inhabited island
- Location in Maldives
- Coordinates: 06°32′29″N 72°58′45″E
- Country: Maldives
- Geographic atoll: Thiladhummathi Atoll
- Administrative atoll: Haa Dhaalu Atoll
- Distance to Malé: 268.16 km (166.63 mi)

Dimensions
  - Length: 1.730 km (1.075 mi)
  - Width: 1.180 km (0.733 mi)

Population (2022)
  - Total: 641
- Time zone: UTC+05:00 (MST)

Neykurendhoo (Dhivehi: ނޭކުރެންދޫ) is one of the inhabited islands of Haa Dhaalu Atoll administrative division and geographically part of Thiladhummathi Atoll in the north of the Maldives.

== History ==
Neykurendhoo was among the islands severely damaged during the great cyclone of 1821 that hit the northern atolls of the Maldives. This was during the reign of Sultan Muhammad Mueenuddeen I.

== Geography ==
The island is 268.16 km (167 mi; 145 nmi) north of the country's capital, Malé.

== Demography ==
Historical population
Year	Pop.	±%
2006	835	—
2014	711	−14.9%
2022	641	−9.8%
2006-2014-2022: Census populations Source:
