= Bileddhoo =

Bileddhoo ބިލެއްދޫ
- Inhabited island
- Location in Maldives
- Coordinates: 03°07′05″N 72°59′10″E
- Country: Maldives
- Administrative atoll: Faafu Atoll
- Distance to Malé: 130.54 km (81.11 mi)

Dimensions
  - Length: 0.830 km (0.516 mi)
  - Width: 0.450 km (0.280 mi)

Population (2022)
  - Total: 967 (including foreigners)
- Time zone: UTC+05:00 (MST)

Bileddhoo (Dhivehi: ބިލެއްދޫ) is one of the inhabited islands of Faafu Atoll.

== Geography ==
The island is 130.54 km (81 mi; 70 nmi) southwest of the country's capital, Malé.

== Demography ==
Historical population
Year	Pop.	±%
2006	821	—
2014	869	+5.8%
2022	967	+11.3%
2006-2022: Census populations Source:
