= Kolamaafushi =

Kolamaafushi ކޮލަމާފުށި
- Inhabited island
- Location in Maldives
- Coordinates: 00°50′15″N 73°11′10″E
- Country: Maldives
- Administrative atoll: Gaafu Alif Atoll
- Distance to Malé: 370.82 km (230.42 mi)

Dimensions
  - Length: 0.675 km (0.419 mi)
  - Width: 0.550 km (0.342 mi)

Population (2022) (including foreigners)
  - Total: 636
- Time zone: UTC+05:00 (MST)

Kolamaafushi (Dhivehi: ކޮލަމާފުށި) is one of the inhabited islands of Gaafu Alif Atoll.

== Geography ==
The island is 370.82 km (230 mi; 200 nmi) south of the country's capital, Malé. It is one of the remotest islands in the Huvadhu Atoll, being about 20 km away from the closest inhabited island. The island is connected to the nearby Kolaa island by a narrow causeway.

== Demography ==
Historical population
Year	Pop.	±%
2006	1,087	—
2014	894	−17.8%
2022	636	−28.9%
2006-2022: Census populations Source:

The total population of Kolamaafushi is 636. There are 282 females and 354 males as of 2022.

The island was the third most populous in the atoll till mid 2000s, however vast numbers of migrations for the past 15 years have brought down the population below 1000.

== Economy ==
Traditionally, its economic activity is pole and line fishing for Tuna (Skipjacks, Yellowfins, Big-eyes etc) using modern mechanized boats. The businessmen of Kolamaafushi have also begun few other economic activities like agriculture, boat building and rearing of goats. These activities are carried out in the uninhabited island, which was previously a separate island later joined to Kolamaafushi.

== Education ==
Gaaf Alif Atoll School is the only school on the island, and has students from lower kindergarten till grade 10. The school was built with the help of a grant from Japan and opened on 28th March 1984.
