= Bandidhoo =

Ban'didhoo ބަނޑިދޫ
- Inhabited island
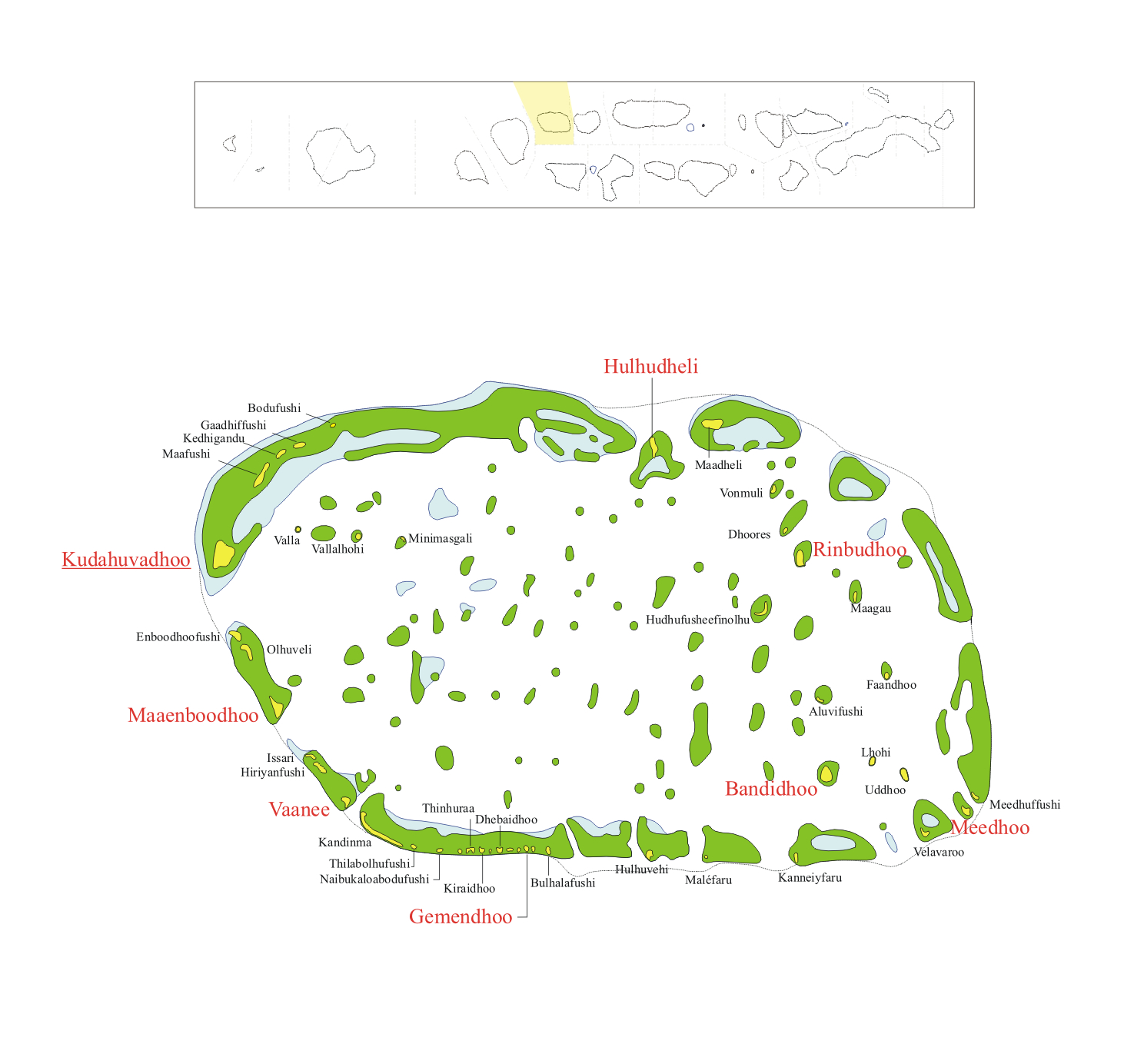
- Bandidhoo

- Location in Maldives
- Coordinates: 02°56′10″N 72°59′25″E
- Country: Maldives
- Geographic atoll: South nilandhe atoll (nilandhe atholhu dhekunuburi)
- Administrative atoll: Dhaalu Atoll
- Distance to Malé: 148.65 km (92.37 mi)

Dimensions
  - Length: 0.575 km (0.357 mi)
  - Width: 0.450 km (0.280 mi)

Population (2022)
  - Total: 629
- Time zone: UTC+05:00 (MST)

Ban'didhoo (Dhivehi: ބަނޑިދޫ) is one of the inhabited islands of Dhaalu Atoll.

== History ==
Like other islands, Ban'didhoo was impacted by the 2004 tsunami with several casualties and massive infrastructure damage. However, the island has managed a full, albeit slow, recovery.

== Geography ==
The island is 148.65 km (92 mi; 80 nmi) south of the country's capital, Malé.

== Demography ==
Historical population
Year	Pop.	±%
2006	578	—
2014	716	+23.9%
2022	629	−12.2%
2006-2022: Census populations Source:

== Economy ==
The commerce of the island is centered around their famous fleet of fishing boats (approx: 25). Although typically a fishing community, inhabitants have started working construction and resort jobs.

=== Services ===
Ban'didhoo has a hospital (Ban'didhoo Health Centre) and a school (Ban'didhoo School) teaching from preschool to grade 10. Ban'didhoo also has a guest house (iruveli inn) and a police station near the harbor. Ban'didhoo also has electricity 24/7 provided by Fenaka.co.

== Transport ==
Ban'didhoo also has a harbour to enable faster loading and unloading for boats. The harbour development was begun on 10 March 2014. The expanded harbour was reopened by President Abdulla Yameen on 4 May 2016.
