= Kalaidhoo =

Inhabited island in the Maldives

Kalaidhoo ކަލައިދޫ
- Inhabited island
- Interactive map of Kalaidhoo
- Coordinates: 2°06′53.8″N 73°33′41.1″E
- Country: Maldives
- Administrative atoll: Laamu Atoll
- Distance to Malé: 518.64 km (322.27 mi)

Population (2022)
  - Total: 655
- Time zone: UTC+05:00 (MST)

Kalaidhoo (Dhivehi: ކަލައިދޫ) is an island in Laamu Atoll of the Maldives. Geographically, it is on the same island as Isdhoo, but administratively a separate island.

== History ==
President Abdulla Yameen declared Kalaidhoo as a separate island on 3 December 2013 and created the Kalaidhoo Council the next day.

There is a famous beys spa (medicine spa) in the island which locals claimed help with skin complaints and have been used in many older and younger generations of the residents. There is also a fangi factory in which many people partake in.

In 2015, locals caught a 10 ft crocodile.

== Demography ==
Historical population
Year	Pop.	±%
2014	552	—
2022	655	+18.7%
2014–2022: Census populations Source:

== Education ==
There is a government-run school, Kalaidhoo School, formerly known as Isdhoo-Kalaidhoo School, for students up to grade 10.
