= Feeali =

Feeali ފީއަލި
- Inhabited island
- Location in Maldives
- Coordinates: 03°16′10″N 73°00′08″E
- Country: Maldives
- Administrative atoll: Faafu Atoll
- Distance to Malé: 114.90 km (71.40 mi)

Dimensions
  - Length: 0.525 km (0.326 mi)
  - Width: 0.425 km (0.264 mi)

Population (2022)
  - Total: 922
- Time zone: UTC+05:00 (MST)
- Feeali Lighthouse
- Construction: metal skeletal tower
- Height: 5 m (16 ft)
- Shape: square pyramidal skeletal tower
- Power source: solar power
- Focal height: 5 m (16 ft)
- Range: 7 nmi (13 km; 8.1 mi)

Feeali (Dhivehi: ފީއަލި) is one of the inhabited islands of Faafu Atoll.

== Geography ==
The island is 114.9 km (71 mi; 62 nmi) southwest of the country's capital, Malé.

== Demography ==
Historical population
| Year | Pop. | ±% |
|---|---|---|
| 2006 | 741 | — |
| 2014 | 810 | +9.3% |
| 2022 | 922 | +13.8% |
2006-2022: Census populations Source:

== See also ==
- List of lighthouses in the Maldives
