= Himmafushi =

Island in Kaafu Atoll, Maldives

Himmafushi ހިއްމަފުށި
- Inhabited island
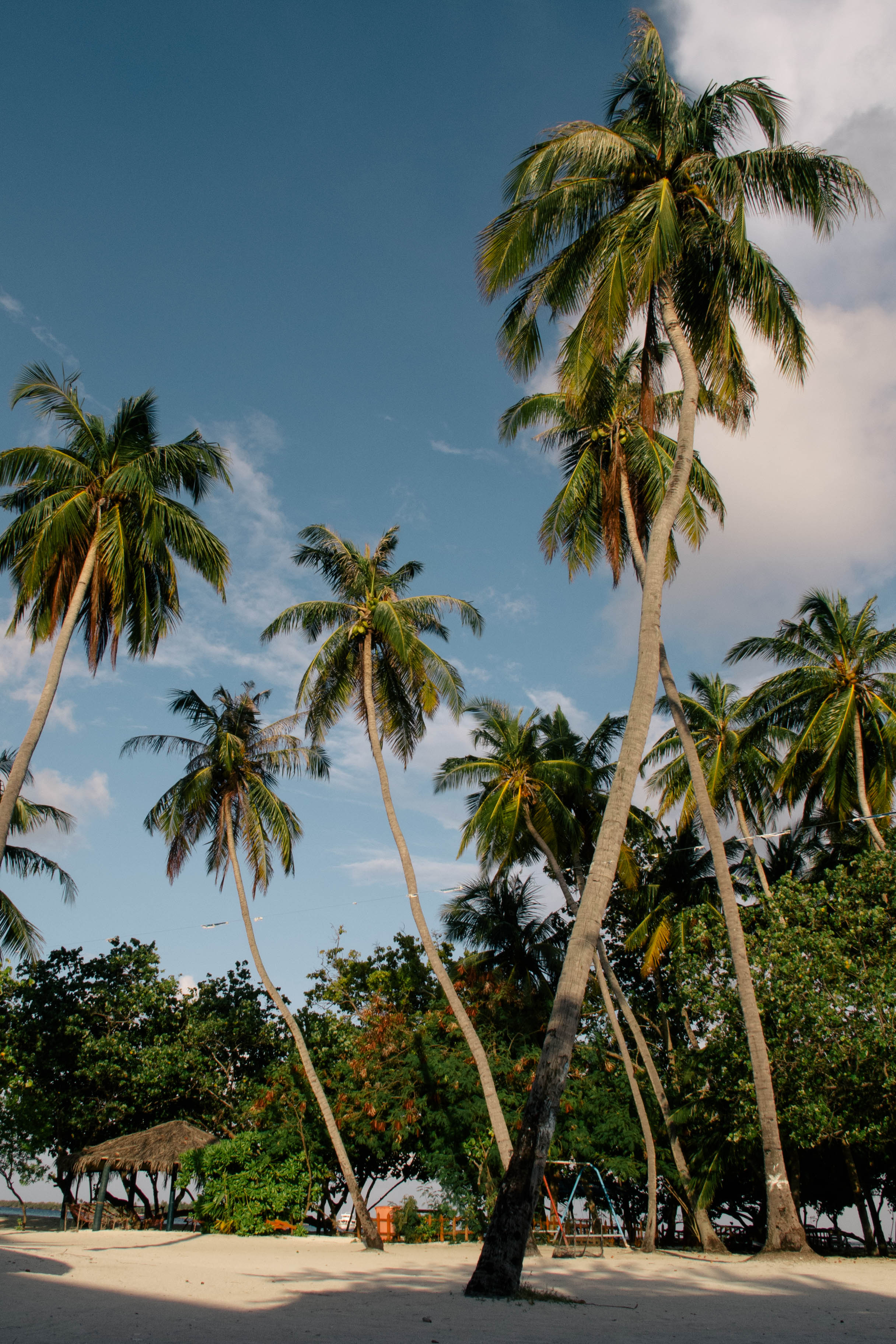
- Jafana Park, a beach area in Himmafushi

- Location in Maldives
- Coordinates: 04°18′33″N 73°34′15″E
- Country: Maldives
- Administrative atoll: Kaafu Atoll
- Distance to Malé: 16.32 km (10.14 mi)

Government
  - Council: Himmafushi Council

Dimensions
  - Length: 0.900 km (0.559 mi)
  - Width: 0.750 km (0.466 mi)

Population (including foreigners2022)
  - Total: 2,012
- Time zone: UTC+05:00 (MST)
- Website: visithimmafushi.com himmafushi.com

Himmafushi (Dhivehi: ހިއްމަފުށި) is one of the inhabited islands of Kaafu Atoll in the Maldives.

== Geography ==
The island is 16.32 km (10 mi; 9 nmi) northeast of the country's capital, Malé. It is located in North Malé Atoll. Himmafushi is about 18 km (11 mi) from Male Airport. The only way to reach it is by boat.

== Demography ==
Historical population
Year	Pop.	±%
2006	1,007	—
2014	1,334	+32.5%
2022	2,012	+50.8%
2006-2022: Census populations Source:

== Economy ==
The island has its own fish processing company and a boat building facility to ease the demands of its own people. There is also a water bottling facility.
