= Naivaadhoo =

Naivaadhoo ނައިވާދޫ
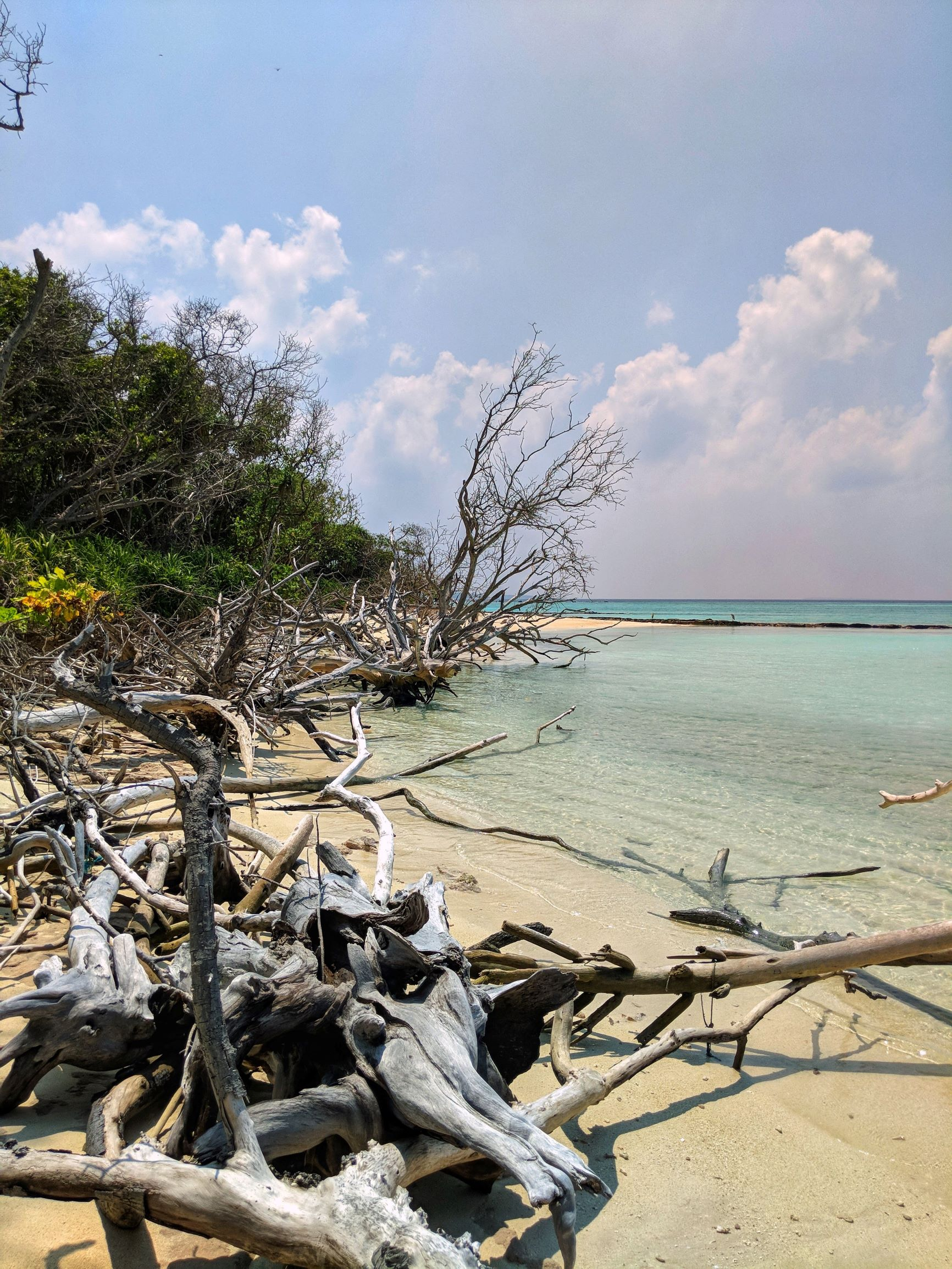
- Beach, Naivaadhoo

- Location in Maldives
- Coordinates: 06°44′50″N 72°56′00″E
- Country: Maldives
- Geographic atoll: Thiladhummathi Atoll
- Administrative atoll: Haa Dhaalu Atoll
- Distance to Malé: 291.48 km (181.12 mi)

Dimensions
  - Length: 1.000 km (0.621 mi)
  - Width: 0.350 km (0.217 mi)

Population (2022)
  - Total: 495
- Time zone: UTC+05:00 (MST)
- Website: naivaadhoo.com

Naivaadhoo (Dhivehi: ނައިވާދޫ) is one of the inhabited islands of Haa Dhaalu Atoll administrative division and geographically part of Thiladhummathi Atoll in the north of the Maldives.

== Geography ==
The island is 291.48 km (181 mi; 157 nmi) north of the country's capital, Malé.

== Demography ==
Historical population
Year	Pop.	±%
2006	375	—
2014	397	+5.9%
2022	495	+24.7%
2006-2014-2022: Census populations Source:

== Other government buildings in Naivaadhoo ==
1. Naivaadhoo council idhaaraa
2. Naivaadhoo Magistrate Court
3. Mosque
4. Naivaadhoo Health Center
5. Naivaadhoo School

== Clubs and NGOs in Naivaadhoo ==
There are three clubs and two NGOs operating in Naivaadhoo. They are:

1. Alhey Sports Club
2. Trainers Sports Club
3. Naivaadhoo Zuvaanunge jamiyya
