= Veyvah (Meemu Atoll) =

Veyvah ވޭވައް
- Inhabited island
- Location in Maldives
- Coordinates: 02°57′20″N 73°36′00″E
- Country: Maldives
- Administrative atoll: Meemu Atoll
- Distance to Malé: 135.25 km (84.04 mi)

Dimensions
  - Length: 1.525 km (0.948 mi)
  - Width: 0.300 km (0.186 mi)

Population (2022)
  - Total: 304
- Time zone: UTC+05:00 (MST)

Veyvah (Dhivehi: ވޭވައް) is one of the inhabited islands of Meemu Atoll.

== Geography ==
The island is 135.25 km (84 mi; 73 nmi) south of the country's capital, Malé. The land area of the island is 41.6 ha (103 acres) in 2018. The island was described as having an area of 34.5 ha (85 acres) in 2007.

== Demography ==
Historical population
Year	Pop.	±%
2006	174	—
2014	223	+28.2%
2022	304	+36.3%
2006-2022: Census populations Source:

== Healthcare ==
Veyvah has a pharmacy. The island was severely affected by an outbreak of dengue fever in 2011, which led to a mosquito eradication programme.

== Transport ==
The reconstruction of Veyvah harbour was contracted to MTCC in 2017.

== Old Friday Mosque ==
The island houses one of the oldest historical mosques in the Maldives. The Old Friday mosque is believed to be over 400 years old and is built out of coral stone. The mosque complex consists of the original mosque building, two water wells and a cemetery. However, extension projects surrounding the original mosques have meant that the original Friday mosque is practically inside the current mosque building.
