= Rasgedhara =

Electoral district in Hithadhoo, Addu City, Maldives

Rasgedhara Dhaairaa is an electoral district in Hithadhoo, Addu City, Maldives. The Election Commission of the Maldives lists candidates for the Addu City Hithadhoo Rasgedhara constituency in local council elections.
