= Nilandhoo (Gaafu Alif Atoll) =

- Inhabited island
- Location in Maldives
- Coordinates: 0°38′5″N 73°26′50″E
- Country: Maldives
- Administrative atoll: Gaafu Alif Atoll
- Distance to Malé: 391.56 km (243.30 mi)

Dimensions
  - Length: 1.575 km (0.979 mi)
  - Width: 0.475 km (0.295 mi)

Population (2014)
  - Total: 600 (including foreigners)
- Time zone: UTC+05:00 (MST)

Nilandhoo (Dhivehi: ނިލަންދޫ) is one of the inhabited islands of Gaafu Alif Atoll.

== Geography ==
The island is 391.56 km (243 mi; 211 nmi) south of the country's capital, Malé.

== Demography ==
Historical population
Year	Pop.	±%
2006	534	—
2014	501	−6.2%
2006-2014: Census populations Source:

== Economy ==
Major sectors of the economy are: fishing and agricultural farming.

=== Services ===
Electricity is a 24 hours Support service.

== Education ==
- Nilandhoo School
- Nursery
