= Maduvvari (Meemu Atoll) =

Maduvvari މަޑުއްވަރި
- Inhabited island
- Location in Maldives
- Coordinates: 03°06′20″N 73°34′25″E
- Country: Maldives
- Administrative atoll: Meemu Atoll
- Distance to Malé: 118.51 km (73.64 mi)

Dimensions
  - Length: 0.375 km (0.233 mi)
  - Width: 0.150 km (0.093 mi)

Population (2022)
  - Total: 318
- Time zone: UTC+05:00 (MST)

Maduvvari (Dhivehi: މަޑުއްވަރި) is one of the inhabited islands of Meemu Atoll.

== Geography ==
The island is 118.51 km (74 mi; 64 nmi) south of the country's capital, Malé. The land area of the island is 8.4 ha (21 acres) in 2018. The island was described as having an area of 3.1 ha (7.7 acres) in 2007. In 2008, at 3.7 ha (9.1 acres), it was the smallest inhabited island in the Maldives.

== Demography ==
Historical population
Year	Pop.	±%
2006	408	—
2014	350	−14.2%
2022	318	−9.1%
2006-2022: Census populations Source:

== Healthcare ==
Maduvvari has a pharmacy.

== Utilities ==
There is an 80 kW (110 hp) generator to provide electricity for the island.
