= Hinnavaru =

Hinnavaru ހިންނަވަރު
- Inhabited island
- Location in Maldives
- Coordinates: 05°29′35″N 73°24′46″E
- Country: Maldives
- Administrative atoll: Lhaviyani Atoll
- Distance to Malé: 146.11 km (90.79 mi)

Area
  - Total: 0.5314 km^{2} (0.2052 sq mi)

Dimensions
  - Length: 1.162 km (0.722 mi)
  - Width: 0.584 km (0.363 mi)

Population (2022)
  - Total: 2,286
  - Density: 4,302/km^{2} (11,140/sq mi)
- Time zone: UTC+05:00 (MST)

Hinnavaru (Dhivehi: ހިންނަވަރު) is one of the inhabited islands of Lhaviyani Atoll. The island has a population of more than 5000 people.

== Geography ==
The island is 146.11 km (91 mi; 79 nmi) north of the country's capital, Malé.

=== Reclamation ===
Land reclamation in Hinnavaru has caused drastic change. From 2010, a reclamation project was carried out by Boskalis, with the island gaining 27 ha (67 acres) of land.

== Demography ==
The registered population as of June 2012 was 4,676 (2,404 male and 2,272 female). There are around 715 houses registered, but people live in only around 480 houses.

As per the census of 2006, Hinnavaru had a population of 3,017 (1,358 male and 1,359 female). The island had a literacy rate of 96.48%. The population of the Island had declined by 1.04% when compared to the 2000 census. By the census of 2014, the number had declined to 2,449.

Hinnavaru is the second most populous island in the Lhaviyani Atoll.

Historical population
Year	Pop.	±%
2006	3,017	—
2014	2,449	−18.8%
2022	2,286	−6.7%
2006-2022: Census populations Source:

== Economy ==
The youth (age 15–20) unemployment rate, as of 2006, was at 35%.

== Communication ==
The available communication services are good in Hinnavaru. Both Ooredoo and Dhiraagu services are available at good quality. 94% of the population uses communication services. A large portion of the population uses internet service.

== Utilities ==
=== Harbour ===
As a help from Kuwait Fund for Arab Economic Development (KFAED) after the 2004 tsunami, a project was carried out in two stages. After the second stage the harbour was inaugurated on 20 November 2010.

=== Electricity ===
Electricity is provided to the island by Urban Development Corporation (URBANCO).

=== Sewerage system ===
A sewerage system was installed by the government of the Maldives, established on 31 January 2011. It was built under the Kuwait Fund for Arab Economic Development (KFAED).

=== Water ===
A safe drinking water supply was introduced in 2017, with the assistance of the United States Agency for International Development.
