= Filitheyo =

Coordinates: 3°12′50″N 73°02′14″E

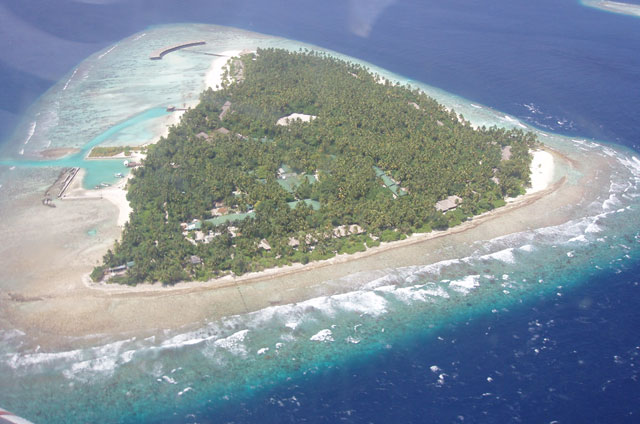
- Interactive map of Filitheyo

Geography
- Archipelago: Faafu Atoll
- Length: 0.9 km (0.56 mi)
- Width: 0.5 km (0.31 mi)

Administration
- Maldives

Filitheyo is an island in the Faafu Atoll. It is also home of one of the newer resorts in the Maldives; as of March 2021, Filitheyo Island Resort is the only resort operating in the Faafu Atoll, but three islands (Himmithi, Mushimasgali, and Maafushi) have since been leased for tourism development. Launched in 1999, the resort consists of 125 guest bungalows along with a main restaurant, two bars, a Thai spa and a dive school. In May 2022, the resort was cited by the Maldives Inland Revenue Authority for having not paid their dues to the state as rent for resort islands.

== Geography ==
Geographically, the island is located approximately 120 km south west of the capital island Malé and can be reached by a 35-minute sea plane flight followed by a ten-minute dhoni ride.

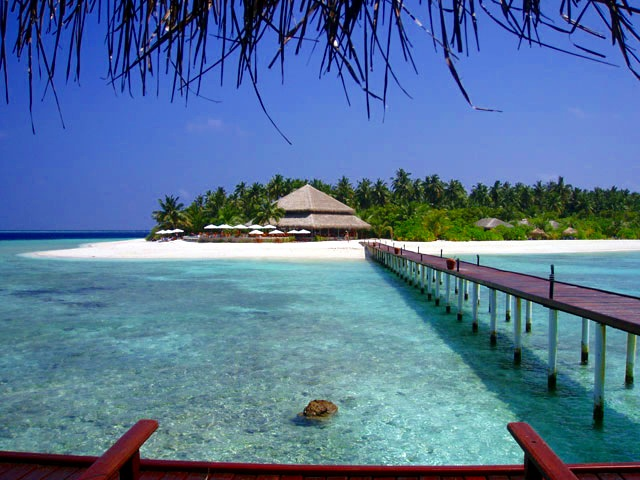
View of Sunset Bar from water bungalows

The island is encircled by its own 'house' reef with safe swimming on the north and southwest shores.

== Ecology ==
Filitheyo has a large collection of lizards of various types, a colony of fruit bats based at the south-east end of the island, at least two herons, crows, at least eight cats, several species of land-dwelling hermit crab and tree-dwelling rats. In 1999, a small marine protection area was established around Filitheyo and fishing around the island ceased.

== Unusual features ==
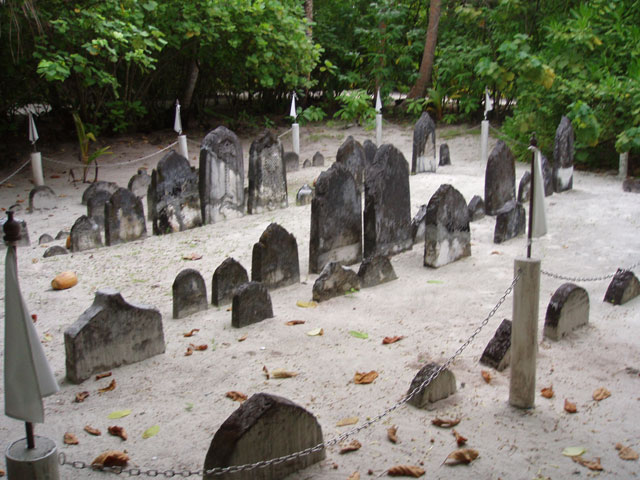
The graveyard

When the island was being cleared for the construction of the resort, a graveyard marked by approximately 30 headstones was discovered about 25m inland from the south-west shore. The origins of those buried and the reason for their burial on the island is unknown.
