= Kurendhoo =

Kurendhoo ކުރެންދޫ
- Inhabited island
- Location in Maldives
- Coordinates: 05°20′02″N 73°27′50″E
- Country: Maldives
- Administrative atoll: Lhaviyani Atoll
- Distance to Malé: 128.22 km (79.67 mi)

Area
  - Total: 0.21 km^{2} (0.081 sq mi)

Dimensions
  - Length: 0.650 km (0.404 mi)
  - Width: 0.375 km (0.233 mi)

Population (2022)
  - Total: 1,171
  - Density: 5,600/km^{2} (14,000/sq mi)
- Time zone: UTC+05:00 (MST)

Kurendhoo (Dhivehi: ކުރެންދޫ) is one of the inhabited islands of Lhaviyani Atoll, Maldives.

== Geography ==
The island is 128.22 km (80 mi; 69 nmi) north of the country's capital, Malé.

== Demography ==
Historical population
| Year | Pop. | ±% |
|---|---|---|
| 2006 | 1,218 | — |
| 2014 | 1,179 | −3.2% |
| 2022 | 1,171 | −0.7% |
2006-2022: Census populations Source:

== Economy ==
The island is small and people earn their living mainly on tourist resort jobs and government jobs. Notable number of people earn their money from agriculture, local shops, tuna fishing, grouper fishing, and other forms of harvesting such as lobster and sea cucumber. Moreover, now the island also introduced guest house business.
