= Haa Dhaalu Atoll =

Atoll of the Maldives

Coordinates: 6°37′N 72°52′E

- Atoll of the Maldives
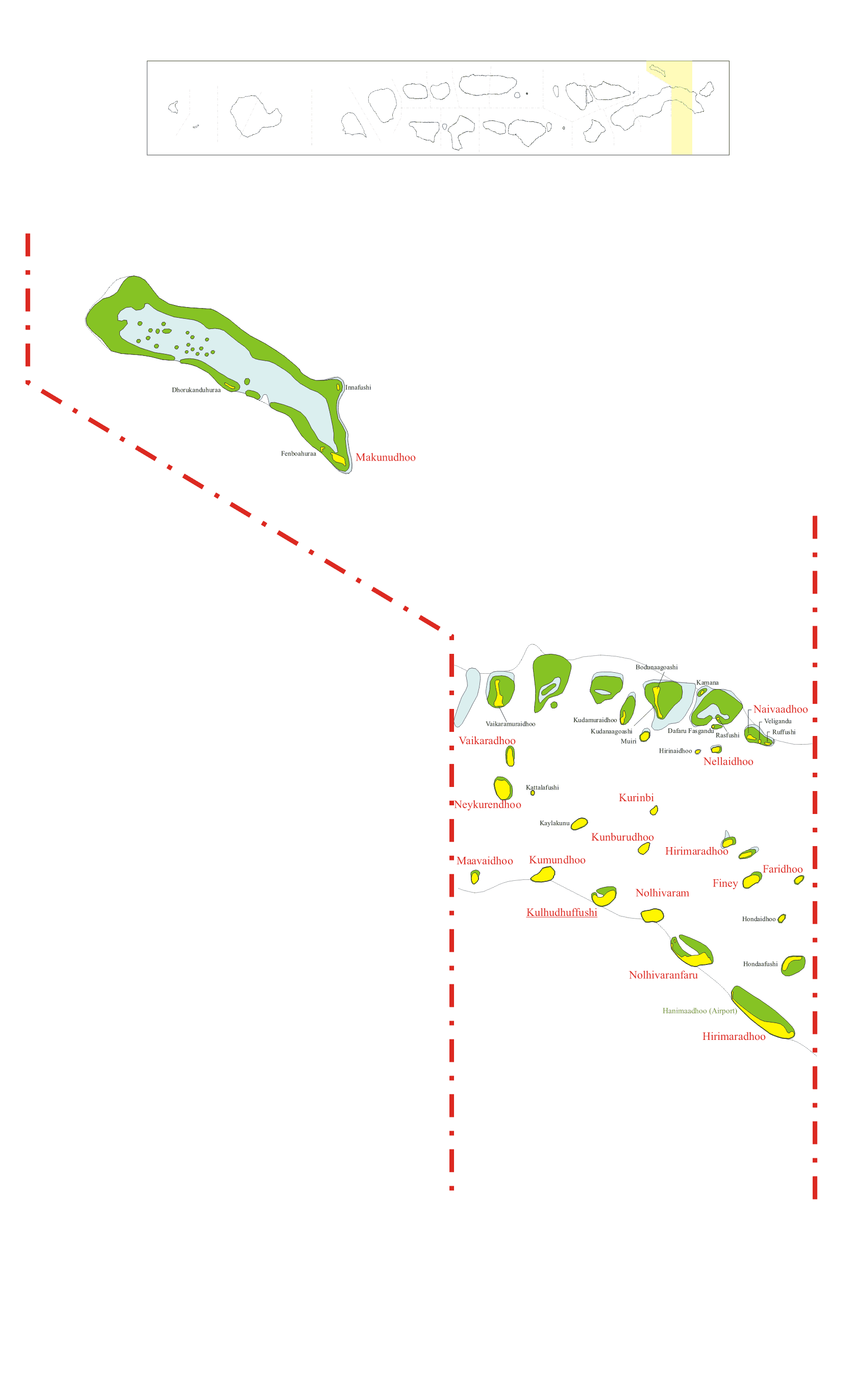

- Location of Haa Dhaalu in Maldives
- Country: Maldives
- Corresponding geographic atoll(s): Thiladhunmathi Dekunuburi
- Location: 6° 48' N and 6° 30' N
- Capital: Kulhudhuffushi

Government
  - Atoll Chief: -

Population
  - Total: 22,845
- Letter code: B
- Dhivehi letter code: HDh (ހދ)
  - Number of islands: 38
  - Inhabited islands: Finey; Hanimaadhoo; Hirimaradhoo; Kulhudhuffushi; Kumundhoo; Kunburudhoo; Kurinbi; Makunudhoo; Naivaadhoo; Nellaidhoo; Neykurendhoo; Nolhivaram; Nolhivaranfaru; Vaikaradhoo
  - Uninhabited islands: Bodunaagoashi; Dafaru Fasgandu; Dhorukanduhuraa; Faridhoo; Maavaidhoo; Fenboahuraa; Hirinaidhoo; Hondaafushi; Hondaidhoo; Innafushi; Kamana; Kattalafushi; Kaylakunu; Kudamuraidhoo; Kudanaagoashi; Muiri; Rasfushi; Ruffushi; Vaikaramuraidhoo; Veligandu
- Resort islands(*), airports(¤) and industrial islands are also considered uninhabited.

Haa Dhaalu Atoll is the code name based on the letters of the Maldivian alphabet commonly used to refer to the administrative division (known as "Atoll") officially known as South Thiladhunmathi Atoll (Maldivian: Thiladhunmathi Dhekunuburi) in the Maldives.

The administrative division consists of the southern section of natural Thiladhunmathi Atoll (which is shared with North Thiladhunmathi (Haa Alifu) Atoll) and Makunudhoo or Maamakunudhoo Atoll (Malcolm Atoll in the Admiralty Charts) with its large reef.

The capital of the administrative division is Kulhudhuffushi.

== History ==
Thiladhunmathi Atoll was divided into northern and southern divisions on 21 May 1958, thus creating the South Thiladhunmathi Atoll administrative division. The northern part of the atoll became North Thiladhunmati Atoll.

The capital of South Thiladhunmathi Atoll was Nolhivaranfaru before it was moved to Kulhudhuffushi on May 6, 1992.

== Transport ==
South Thiladhunmathi is linked by air with the Maldivian capital of Malé as there are two airports in the atoll. one in Hanimaadhoo, (which is an international airport) and a domestic airport in Kulhudhuffushi. As well as dhoani's are used for transportation of cargo and people between Malé.
