= Kanifushi (Lhaviyani Atoll) =

Kanifushi Lighthouse
- Location: Kanifushi, Lhaviyani Atoll, Maldives
- Coordinates: 5°22′32″N 73°22′43″E

Tower
- Foundation: concrete base
- Construction: metal skeletal tower
- Height: 12 m (39 ft)
- Shape: square pyramidal skeletal tower
- Markings: grey tower with black rectangular daymark
- Power source: solar power

Light
- Focal height: 15 m (49 ft)
- Range: 10 nmi (19 km; 12 mi)

Kanifushi Island is situated in the Lhaviyani Atoll, Maldives. Kanifushi is one of the few resort islands in Laviyani Atoll; the resort started operation on 15 December 2013, managed and operated by Atmosphere Hotels & Resorts.

== Geography ==
Kanifushi Island is approximately 2 km in length and 90 meters wide.

== See also ==
- List of lighthouses in the Maldives
