= Magoodhoo (Faafu Atoll) =

Magoodhoo މަގޫދޫ
- Inhabited island
- Location in Maldives
- Coordinates: 03°04′40″N 72°57′55″E
- Country: Maldives
- Administrative atoll: Faafu Atoll
- Distance to Malé: 135.56 km (84.23 mi)

Government
  - Island Chief: Migdhadh Adam

Dimensions
  - Length: 0.950 km (0.590 mi)
  - Width: 0.350 km (0.217 mi)

Population (2022)
  - Total: 702
- Time zone: UTC+05:00 (MST)

Magoodhoo (Dhivehi: މަގޫދޫ) is one of the inhabited islands of Faafu Atoll in the Maldives.

== Geography ==
The island is 135.56 km (84 mi; 73 nmi) southwest of the country's capital, Malé.

== Demography ==
Historical population
Year	Pop.	±%
2006	518	—
2014	524	+1.2%
2022	702	+34.0%
2006-2022: Census populations Source:
