= Lhaviyani Atoll =

Coordinates: 5°23′N 73°29′E

- Atoll
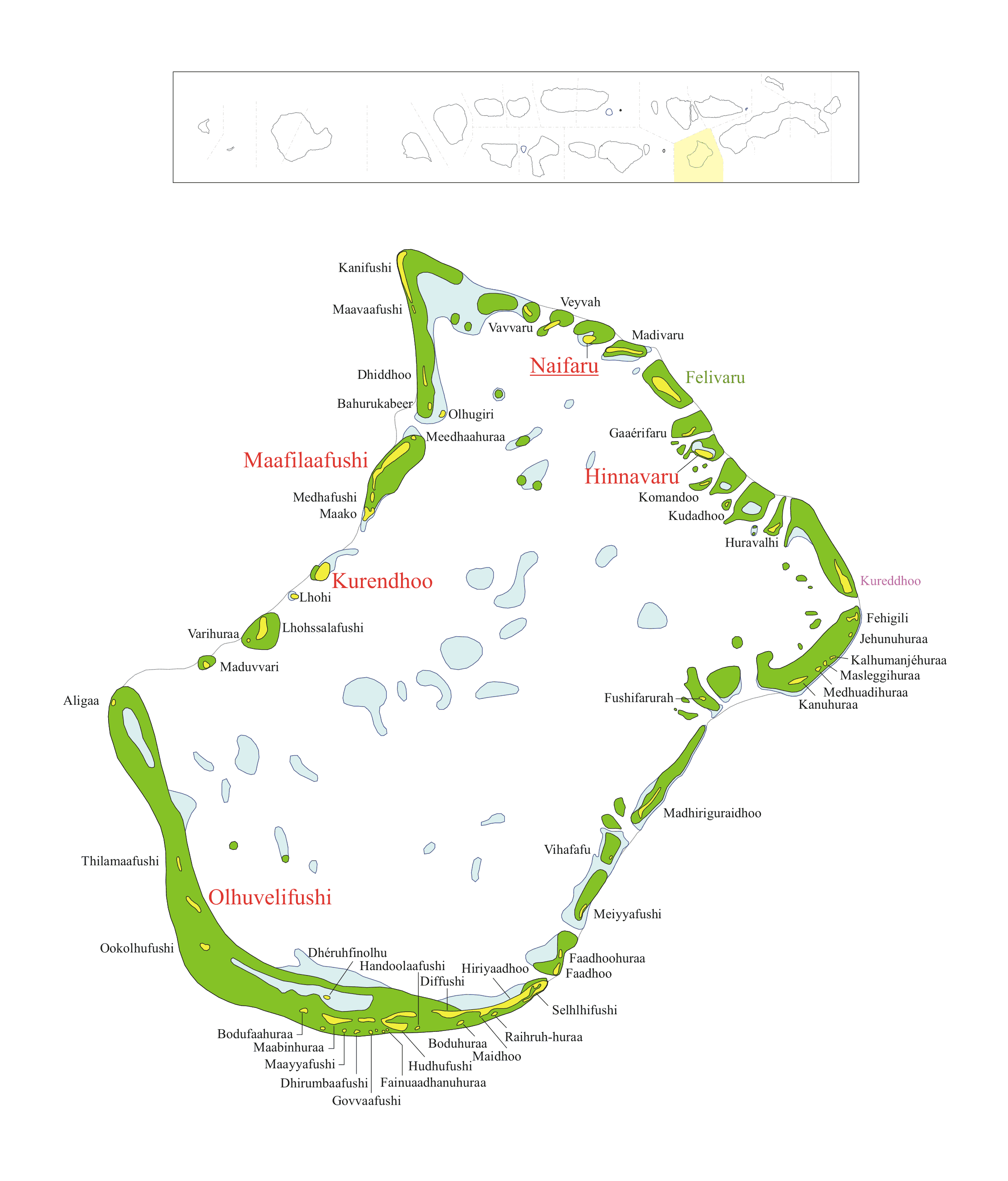

- Location of Lhaviyani in Maldives
- Country: Maldives
- Corresponding geographic atoll(s): Faadhippolhu
- Location: 5° 15' N and 5° 34' N
- Capital: Naifaru

Government
  - Atoll Chief: Qasim Abdul Kareem

Population
  - Total: 11,905
- Letter code: G
- Dhivehi letter code: Lh (ޅ)
  - Number of islands: 52
  - Inhabited islands: Hinnavaru, Kurendhoo, Naifaru, Olhuvelifushi
  - Uninhabited islands: Aligau, Bahurukabeeru, Bodhuhuraa, Bodufaahuraa, Bodugaahuraa, Dhidhdhoo, Dhirubaafushi, Diffushi, Faadhoo, Fainuaadham-Huraa, Fehigili, Felivaru, Fushifaru, Gaaerifaru, Govvaafushi, Hadoolaafushi, Hiriyadhoo, Hudhuranfushi, Huravalhi, Kalhumanjehuraa, Kalhuoiyfinolhu, Kanifushi, Kanuhuraa, Komandoo, Kudadhoo, Kuredhdhoo, Lhohi, Lhossalafushi, Maabinhuraa, Maavaafushi, Madhiriguraidhoo, Madivaru, Maduvvari, Maidhoo, Mayyafushi, Medhadhihuraa, Medhafushi, Meedhaahuraa, Mey-yyaafushi, Musleygihuraa, Ookolhufinolhu, Raiyruhhuraa, Selhlhifushi, Thilamaafushi, Varihuraa, Vavvaru, Veligadu, Veyvah, Vihafarufinolhu
- Website: http://lhaviyani.gov.mv/
- Resort islands(*), airports(¤) and industrial islands are also considered uninhabited.

Lhaviyani Atoll (also known as Faadhippolhu Atoll) is an administrative division of the Maldives. Its abbreviation is Lh.

Lhaviyani Atoll is located between 5° 15" and 5° 35" N and between 73° 20" and 74° 40" E. The capital of the atoll is Naifaru. There are a total of 54 islands in the atoll of which only 4 are inhabited: namely Naifaru, Hinnavaru, Kurendhoo and Olhuvelifushi.

The island of Maafilaafushi was resettled in the 1980s in order to relieve the lack of land availability in Malé. The island once served as the capital of the separatist Kingdom of Boduthiladhunmathi. In Mohamed Rannabadeyri Thakuru with the help of Adhi Raja of Cannanore attacked Male' and tried to overthrow the kingdom of Ibrahim Kalaafaanu (Sultan Ibrahim III 1585–1609) in However being unable to take control of the capital Male' they fled to Faadhippolhu where Mohamed Rannabadeyri controlled the northern atolls of the Maldives until he was overthrown by Sultan Muhammad Imaduddin I (1620–1648).

There are eight resorts in the atoll, namely Thilamaafushi, Kuredhu, Komandoo, Kanuhuraa Palmbeach, Kanifushi, Innahura and Hudhuranfushi. The only canning factory in the country is in Felivaru located between Naifaru and Hinnavaru.

Traditionally, Maldivians call this atoll simply 'Faadhippolhu', without adding the word 'Atholhu' at the end. This is done only with the names of some atolls. In the early 12th century, during the reign of King Koimala Siri Mahaabarana Mahaa Radun- the first king to rule over all the Maldive islands- this atoll was called Faadu Bur.

Haa Alifu, Haa Dhaalu, Shaviyani, Noonu, Raa, Baa, Kaafu, etc. (including Lhaviyani) are code letters assigned to the present administrative divisions of the Maldives. They are not the proper names of the natural atolls that make up these divisions. Some atolls are divided into two administrative divisions while other divisions are made up of two or more natural atolls. The order followed by the code letters is from North to South, beginning with the first letters of the Thaana alphabet used in Dhivehi. These code letters are not accurate from the geographical and cultural point of view. However, they have become popular among tourists and foreigners in the Maldives who find them easier to pronounce than the true atoll names in Dhivehi, (save a few exceptions, like Ari Atoll).

Lhaviyani Atoll is known for its rich marine biodiversity. The abundance of seagrass here provides essential nutrients, particularly for green sea turtles. The population of stingrays is also higher than average. The hard coral ecosystems throughout the atoll are in a very healthy state. For this reason, Lhaviyani Atoll is home to some of the best house reefs in the Maldives, such as those at Kuredu or Le Méridien Maldives.

The airport is Madivaru Airport on Madivaru.

Kurendhoo within Lhaviyani Atoll hosts a regionally significant breeding population of white-tailed tropicbirds of around 800 birds. This abundance is likely due to sustained rat control efforts on the island. A small population of tropical shearwaters also lives on the island.
