= Faafu Atoll =

Coordinates: 3°14′N 72°56′E

- atoll of the Maldives
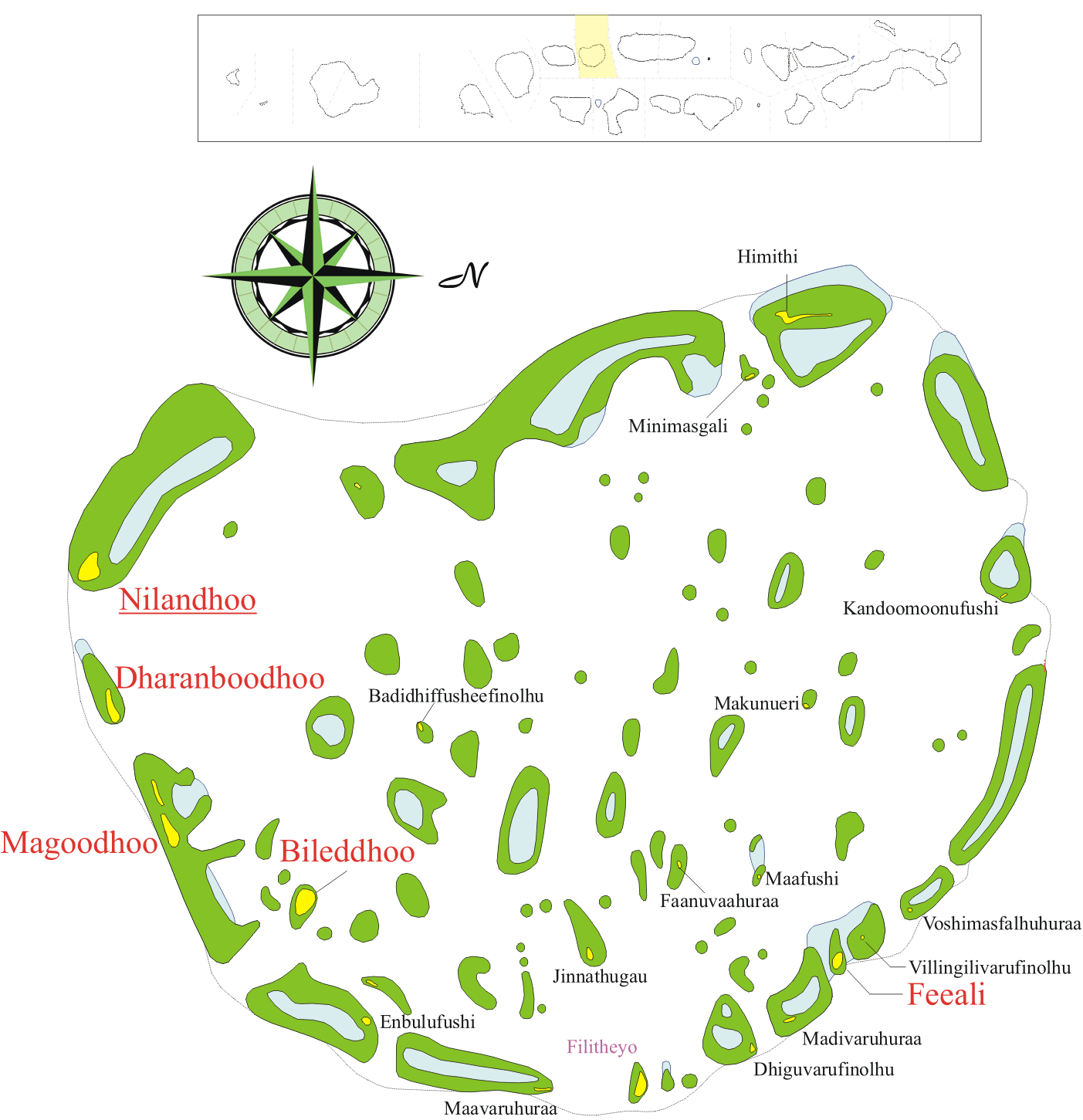

- Location of Faafu in Maldives
- Country: Maldives
- Corresponding geographic atoll(s): Nilandhe Atholhu Uthuruburi
- Location: 3° 20' N and 3° 03' N
- Capital: Nilandhoo

Government
  - Atoll Chief: Abdulla Jameel

Population
  - Total: 4,869
- Letter code: L
- Dhivehi letter code: F (ފ)
  - Number of islands: 23
  - Inhabited islands: Bileddhoo * Dharanboodhoo * Feeali * Magoodhoo * Nilandhoo
  - Uninhabited islands: Badidhiffusheefinolhu, Dhiguvarufinolhu, Enbulufushi, Faanuvaahuraa, Filitheyo, Himithi, Jinnathugau, Kandoomoonufushi, Maafushi, Maavaruhuraa, Madivaruhuraa, Makunueri, Minimasgali, Villingilivarufinolhu, Voshimasfalhuhuraa
- Resort islands(*), airports(¤) and industrial islands are also considered uninhabited.

Faafu Atoll (also known as Northern Nilandhe Atoll or Nilandhe Atholhu Uthuruburi) is an administrative division of the Maldives. It corresponds to the natural atoll of the same name.

Certain islands of this atoll used to be inhabited, like Himithi. The islanders were resettled in other islands so that Friday prayers could be held.

NOTE: Haa Alifu, Haa Dhaalu, Shaviyani, Noonu, Raa, Baa, Kaafu, etc. (including Faafu) are code letters assigned to the present administrative divisions of the Maldives. They are not the proper names of the natural atolls that make up these divisions. Some atolls are divided into two administrative divisions while other divisions are made up of two or more natural atolls. The order followed by the code letters is from North to South, beginning with the first letters of the Thaana alphabet used in Dhivehi. These code letters are not accurate from the geographical and cultural point of view. However, they have become popular among tourists and foreigners in the Maldives who find them easier to pronounce than the true atoll names in Dhivehi, (save a few exceptions, like Ari Atoll).

== Geography ==
The atoll is separated from its Sister atoll (Dhaalu Atoll) by a 6km long strip of Ocean, The atoll is also smaller than its Sister atoll (Dhaalu Atoll). The atoll contains 23 Islands, of which 5 are inhabited. The capital of the Atoll is Nilandhoo, The largest and most Populated Island in the atoll. The shape of the atoll resembles Dhaalu Atoll, but a little bit shorter.
