= Meemu Atoll =

Coordinates: 3°01′N 73°28′E

- atoll of the Maldives

- Location of Meemu in Maldives
- Country: Maldives
- Corresponding geographic atoll(s): Mulaku Atoll
- Location: 3° 11' N and 2° 45' N
- Capital: Muli

Government
  - Atoll Chief: Ahmed Saavi

Population
  - Total: 4,705
- Letter code: K
- Dhivehi letter code: M (މ)
  - Number of islands: 33
  - Inhabited islands: Boli Mulah * Dhiggaru * Kolhufushi * Maduvvaree * Muli * Naalaafushi * Raimmandhoo * Veyvah
  - Uninhabited islands: Boahuraa, Dhekunuboduveli, Dhiththudi, Erruh-huraa, Fenboafinolhu, Fenfuraaveli, Gaahuraa, Gasveli, Gongalu Huraa, Haafushi, Hakuraahuraa, Hurasveli, Kekuraalhuveli, Kudadhigandu, Kurali, Kudausfushi, Maahuraa, Maalhaveli, Maausfushi, Madifushi, Medhufushi, Raabandhihuraa, Seedhihuraa, Seedhihuraaveligandu, Thuvaru, Uthuruboduveli, Veriheybe
- Resort islands(*), airports(¤) and industrial islands are also considered uninhabited.

Mulaku Atoll or Meemu Atoll (Dhivehi: މުލަކުތޮޅު) is an administrative division of the Maldives. It corresponds to the natural atoll of the same name, also known as Mulak Atoll or 'Mulakatolhu'.

There is a mosque of historical value in Kolhufushi Island, but no Buddhist remains have been found on this atoll. Also of historic importance is the 1573 wreck of Kalhuohfummi off the south eastern reef of Kolhuvaariyaafushi island.

NOTE: Haa Alifu, Haa Dhaalu, Shaviyani, Noonu, Raa, Baa, Kaafu, etc. (including Meemu) are code letters assigned to the present administrative divisions of the Maldives. They are not the proper names of the natural atolls that make up these divisions. Some atolls are divided into two administrative divisions while other divisions are made up of two or more natural atolls. The order meemu followed by the code letters is from North to South, beginning with the first letters of the Thaana alphabet used in Dhivehi. These code letters are not accurate from the geographical and cultural point of view. However, they have become popular among tourists and foreigners in the Maldives who find them easier to pronounce than the true atoll names in Dhivehi, (save a few exceptions, like Ari Atoll).
