= Administrative divisions of the Maldives =

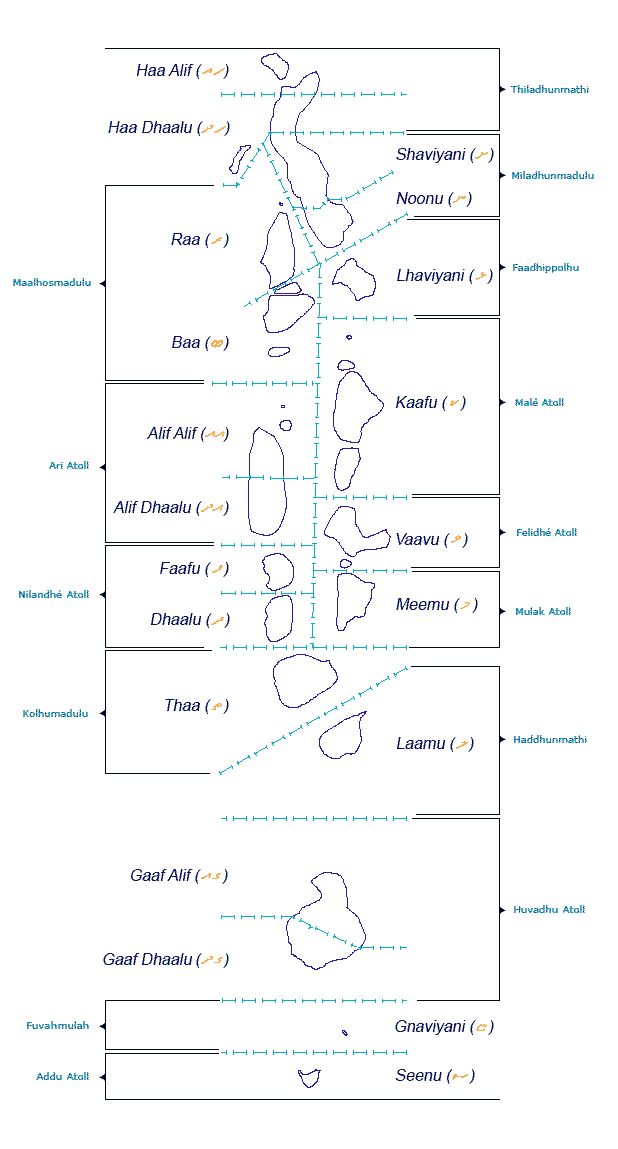
Each administrative atoll is marked, along with the thaana letter used to identify the atoll. Natural atolls are labelled in light blue. Full view of the map

The administrative divisions of the Maldives refers to the various units of government that provide local government services in the Maldives. According to the Decentralization Act 2010, the administrative divisions of the Maldives would consist of atolls, islands, and cities; each is administered by its own local council, under the basic terms of home rule. Geographically, the Maldives are formed by a number of natural atolls plus a few islands and isolated reefs which form a pattern from north to south. Administratively, there are currently 189 islands, 18 atolls and 4 cities in the Maldives.

== Background ==
=== During the Gayoom presidency ===
During the presidency of Maumoon Abdul Gayyoom, the administrative divisions consisted of 20 administrative atolls, all controlled by the central government in Malé.

=== During the Nasheed presidency ===
==== Seven provinces ====
In 2008, in an attempt of decentralization, the Nasheed government divided the country into seven provinces. According to this system, the bill submitted by the government to decentralize the country was passed with the support of opposition-majority parliament, with their amendments to the bill. The final bill passed in 2010 by the parliament and ratified by the president saw the country's decentralisation as 21 constituencies.

The seven provinces were the following, followed by the atolls grouped within:

- Upper North Province (consisting of Haa Alif, Haa Dhaalu and Shaviyani Atolls; capital: Kulhudhuffushi)
- North Province (consisting of Baa, Lhaviyani, Noonu and Raa Atolls; capital: Velidhoo)
- North Central Province (consisting of Alif Alif, Alif Dhaal, Kaafu and Vaavu Atolls, and Malé City; capital: Thulusdhoo)
- Central Province (consisting of Dhaalu, Faafu and Meemu Atolls; capital: Kudahuvadhoo)
- Upper South Province (consisting of Thaa and Laamu Atolls; capital: Gan)
- South Central Province (consisting of Gaafu Alif and Gaafu Dhaalu Atolls; capital: Thinadhoo)
- South Province (consisting of Gnaviyani Atoll and Addu City; capital: Hithadhoo)

The seven provinces closely correspond to the historic divisions of Uthuru Boduthiladhunmathi. Dhekunu Boduthiladhunmathi, Uthuru Medhu-Raajje, Medhu-Raajje, Dhekunu Medhu-Raajje, Huvadhu (Suvadive, Suvaidu or Suvadiva) and Addumulah.

==== Decentralization ====
On 15 October 2010, the government released a finalized list of the administrative constituencies established under the Decentralization Act. It listed 189 administrative constituencies. Out of these constituencies:

- 4 constituencies were declared "cities", as according to the criteria for determining cities in this act. These constituencies were Malé, Fuvahmulah, Kulhudhuffushi and Seenu Atoll. After a referendum among the people, Seenu Atoll was renamed "Addu City". Each city would be served by a city council.
- 189 constituencies were declared "islands", as according to the criteria for determining islands in this act. These islands are grouped together into 17 atolls. Each atoll shall be served by an atoll council (which will be located on the capital island of the respective atoll), under which each island has its own island council.

Therefore, the final organization of the administrative divisions are as below:

- 17 atolls
- 4 cities
- 189 islands

==== National offices ====
Although the earlier provincial decentralization was rejected by Parliament, President Nasheed reinstated the concept through "National Administrations". The National Administrations of Maldives were in the same divisions as the earlier provinces, and the previous province offices were reinstated as the office of that National Administration, to which the atoll councils reported to accordingly. The National Administrations acted as an extension of the central government in Male' for the convenience of dealing with regional affairs. The National Administrations operated under the Ministry of Home Affairs. The seven National Administrations were:-

- Upper North National Administration
- North National Administration
- North Central National Administration
- Central National Administration
- South Central National Administration
- Upper South National Administration
- South National Administration

Each administration was headed by a state minister assigned by the president.

All 7 National Offices were abolished by the Waheed administration on 24 April 2012.

== Divisions ==
The first-level divisions are cities and atolls.

=== City ===
A city is an inhabited area with a population of 10,000+. The criteria also includes a certain level of economic development and facilities available. A city has a "city council" which governs over the affairs of the city, and keeps communication with the central government. A city will not be included within an administrative atoll. A city has further subdivisions called "wards" or "districts". A city council will also govern over any uninhabited islands or resort islands within its designated area. There are five cities in Maldives: Malé, Addu, Fuvahmulah, Kulhudhuffushi, and Thinadhoo. Thinadhoo became a city in 2023.

=== Atoll ===
- Atolls of the Maldives

The administrative definition of an "atoll" differs from the actual meaning of the word 'atoll'. While naturally, an "atoll" refers to a ring of islands, an "atoll" in the administrative sense, refers to a group of "island" class constituencies, not necessarily within the requirements of a natural atoll. While the majority of administrative atolls are indeed natural atolls, there are exceptions. Each administrative atoll has an "atoll council" which monitors the work of the "island councils" in the atoll, and keep communications with the central government. An atoll council also governs all uninhabited islands and resort islands in their area. There are 20 atolls in Maldives.

=== Island ===
The administrative definition of an "island" differs from the actual meaning of the word 'island'. While naturally, an "island" refers to a land-mass surrounded by water, an "island" in the administrative sense, refers to a specified inhabited area within an administrative atoll, which is governed over by an "island council", though the majority of "island" class constituencies are indeed natural islands. There are 189 such islands, each with its own island council. (Except for Felivaru, Lhaviyani Atoll)

== Codes and names of the administrative divisions ==
Every first-level administrative division of the Maldives have the following:

1. An official name, for example Thiladhunmathi Uthuruburi (meaning Thiladhunmathi North).
  This corresponds to the geographical Maldivian name of the Atoll.
2. A Maldivian code letter, for example: Haa Alifu. When there are two letters, the second stands either for "North" (Alifu) or for "South" (Dhaalu). Alifu means Uthuruburi, and Dhaalu means Dhekunuburi.
  This code was adopted for convenience. It began in order to facilitate radio communication between the atolls and the central administration. As there are certain islands in different atolls that have the same name, for administrative purposes this code is quoted before the name of the island: for example, Baa Funadhoo, Kaafu Funadhoo, Gaafu-Alifu Funadhoo. This code denomination has been very much misused by foreigners and tourists who do not understand the proper use of these names, and the true Maldivian names have often been ignored in publications for tourists. Maldivians may use the letter code name in colloquial conversation, but in serious geographic, historical or cultural writings, the true geographical name always takes precedence.
3. A Latin code letter, for example: (A).
  The Latin code letter is normally used in boat registration plates. The letter stands for the atoll and the number for the island.

Each atoll has a capital island. All islands of every atoll have their own official name. All cities have an official name, and names for their subdivisions. They also have a Latin code letter assigned to them.

Traditionally, Maldivians call the atolls ending in '-madulu' or '-mathi' by their name without adding the word 'Atoll' at the end. For example, it is correct to write simply Kolhumadulu, without adding the word 'Atholhu' or 'Atoll'. This is also the case in the atoll known as Faadhippolhu as well as the small detached atoll of Fuvahmulah.

== First-level administrative divisions ==
=== Atolls ===
ISO 3166-2:MV	Latin Letter	Code Abbr.	Local letter	Code Name	Official name	Capital	Population (2022 census)
MV-07	A	HA	ހއ	Haa Alif	Thiladhunmathi Uthuruburi	Didhdhoo	24,598
MV-24	C	Sh	ށ	Shaviyani	Miladhunmadulu Uthuruburi	Funadhoo	13,698
MV-25	D	N	ނ	Noonu	Miladhunmadulu Dhekunuburi	Manadhoo	12,503
MV-13	E	R	ރ	Raa	Maalhosmadulu Uthuruburi	U'ngoofaaru	17,581
MV-20	F	B	ބ	Baa	Maalhosmadulu Dhekunuburi	Eydhafushi	10,631
MV-03	G	Lh	ޅ	Lhaviyani	Faadhippolhu	Naifaru	8,992
MV-26	H	K	ކ	Kaafu	Malé Atholhu	Thulusdhoo	17,749
MV-02	U	AA	އއ	Alif Alif	Ari Atholhu Uthuruburi	Rasdhoo	8,017
MV-00	I	ADh	އދ	Alif Dhaal	Ari Atholhu Dhekunuburi	Mahibadhoo	10,540
MV-04	J	V	ވ	Vaavu	Felidhu Atholhu	Felidhoo	1,995
MV-12	K	M	މ	Meemu	Mulak Atholhu	Muli	5,490
MV-14	L	F	ފ	Faafu	Nilandhe Atholhu Uthuruburi	Nilandhoo	4,869
MV-17	M	Dh	ދ	Dhaalu	Nilandhe Atholhu Dhekunuburi	Kudahuvadhoo	6,637
MV-08	N	Th	ތ	Thaa	Kolhumadulu	Veymandoo	10,260
MV-05	O	L	ލ	Laamu	Haddhunmathi	Fonadhoo	14,699
MV-27	P	GA	ގއ	Gaafu Alif	Huvadhu Atholhu Uthuruburi	Villingili	9,190

=== Cities ===
ISO 3166-2:MV	Latin Letter	Code Abbr.	Local letter	Code Name	Official name	Capital	Population (2022 census)
MV-MLE	T	-	-	Malé	Malé City	Malé	211,908
MV-29	R	Gn	ޏ	Gnaviyani	Fuvahmulah City	Fuvahmulah	9,177
MV-01	S	S	ސ	Seenu/Addu	Addu City	Hithadhoo	25,062
MV-23	B	HDh	ހދ	Haa Dhaalu	Kulhudhuffushi City	Kulhudhuffushi	10,131
MV-28	Q	GDh	ގދ	Gaafu Dhaalu	Huvadhu Atholhu Dhekunuburi	Thinadhoo	12,758

== See also ==
- Atolls of the Maldives
- ISO 3166-2:MV
