= Kendhikolhudhoo =

Kendhiikulhudhoo ކެނދިކުޅުދޫ
- Inhabited island
- Location in Maldives
- Coordinates: 05°56′58″N 73°25′00″E
- Country: Maldives
- Geographic atoll: Miladhummadulhu Atoll
- Administrative atoll: Southern Miladhunmadulu
- Distance to Malé: 196.46 km (122.07 mi)

Dimensions
  - Length: 4.880 km (3.032 mi)
  - Width: 0.550 km (0.342 mi)

Population (2022)
  - Total: 1,556
- Time zone: UTC+05:00 (MST)

Kendhikulhudhoo (Dhivehi: ކެނދިކުޅުދޫ) is one of the inhabited islands of Noonu Atoll in the northern province of Maldives. The island is among the 10th biggest islands in the Maldives archipelago.

== History ==
Severe island erosion led the people of Tholhendhoo to migrate to Kundhikulhudhoo on 1 January 1993.

== Geography ==
The island is 196.46 km (122 mi; 106 nmi) north of the country's capital, Malé. Kendhikulhudhoo is located at 5° 56' 58"N degree of latitude and 73° 25'00'E degree of longitude. The island has an area of 2.06 km^{2} (0.80 sq mi) with a length of 4.92 km (3.06 mi) and width of 0.51 km (0.32 mi).

The geography of Kendhikulhudhoo is unique with six mangrove areas locally known as "kulhi" in the island. They are "Mai falhu", "Dhimaafalhu", "Hikikulhi", "Tholhifalhu", "Gan'baafalhu", Fin'dhana gonni and "Gaathudee kolhu". However, these mangrove areas are faced with a major problem of dumping garbage by the islanders. In addition, an aquaculture project carried out recently in the largest mangrove area "Mai falhu" destroyed part of the mangrove ecosystem in the area.

Bluepeace, a non-government organization focused on environmental protection of Maldives reported that these mangrove areas absorbed much of the impact of the December 2004 saving the island from the destruction of property and loss of human lives. Several projects have been initiated by local NGOs to protect the mangrove areas in the island. One of such project was "Save KK" initiated by Society for Kendhikulhudhoo Island Development (SKID) in association with UNDP.

== Demography ==
Historical population
Year	Pop.	±%
2006	1,204	—
2014	1,288	+7.0%
2022	1,556	+20.8%
2006-2014-2022: Census populations Source:

Kendhikulhudhoo has the 4th largest population in the atoll with a registered population of 1,556 people of which 806 are male and 750 are female. However, only 1288 people live in the island as per census 2014. Since more men work in resorts, industrial islands, and capital Male’, 724 women live on the island compared to 564 men.

As per the statistics of a secretariat of Kendhikulhudhoo council, the population of Kendhikolhu is slightly higher than the population of Kulhudhoo with 923 people in Kendhikolhu while 898 people in Kulhudhoo. The total number of households in Kendhikolhu and Kulhudhoo altogether is 241.

== Governance ==
People in Kendhikulhudhoo resides in two wards namely Kendhikolhu (Dhivehi: ކެނދިކޮޅު) which is south of the island and Kulhudhoo (Dhivehi: ކުޅުދޫ) which is the north of the island. Until the local government law which was enacted on 17 May 2010, the two wards were two separate administrative units managed by island offices located in each ward. This developed rivalry which led to some social issues in the past.

Kendhikulhudhoo was represented in the People’s Majlis by Member of Parliament Ahmed Easa, who served multiple terms for the constituency.

== Education ==
Kendhikulhudhoo School is the only school on the island. It was opened on 28 February 1967 and is a public school under the Ministry of Education which provides preschool, primary, secondary and higher secondary education. The school was originally operating in 3 campuses, but merged to one session in 2012 in a single building. There are 455 students currently studying in the school.

In addition, an outreach center under the Faculty of Open Learning of Maldives National University was recently established in the island. The center currently offers foundation, diploma and degree programs in the field of business, judicial administration and education. Courses open for admission in the center January 2017 include Bachelor of Business, Diploma in Judicial Administration, Bachelor of Teaching primary and English for Further Studies. There are some other educational institutions like Quran classes and tuition centers as well in the island.

== Economy ==
The island has 16 shops and 6 restaurants. Most of the shops are dedicated to retail grocery and daily use items while there are 3 shops which sell garment and cosmetic items and 2 dedicated to selling construction materials as well. Major items required for construction like cement, timber and plastic pipe and fittings can be bought from these shops. Goods like furniture and other household items which are not available on the island are bought from the Atoll capital Manadhoo and Capital Male'.

Most of the working age population work in the tourism and fishing industries. Currently, there are 7 fishing vessels operating on the island.

The biggest government employer in the island is Kendhikulhudhoo School followed by Kendhikulhudhoo Health Center and the Secretariat of Kendhikulhudhoo council. There is also a court and a branch of FENAKA cooperation in the island that provides electricity, water, and sewage services.

The island does not have any bank or a branch of a bank. However, one retail shop provides a cash back service where customers can withdraw up to MVR 2000 per transaction from debit cards of Bank of Maldives. Apart from this, a team of Bank of Maldives visits the island every month for one day. This team provides some banking functions like deposits, withdrawals, and applications for different services offered by Bank of Maldives.

=== Tourism ===
The most common mode of transportation from the island to capital Male' is by boat which takes approximately 10 to 12 hours of travel. A scheduled speed boat also operates from Noonu Atoll to the capital twice a week.

There is also a ferry route Z2R1 provided by Raajje Transport Link (RTL) between the islands of Kendhikolhudhoo, Henbadhoo, Maalhendhoo, Landhoo, Maafaru and Manadhoo.

The domestic airport at Ifuru in Raa Atoll is the closest airport to the island.

There are speed boats for hire available on the Kendhikulhudhoo and other islands close to the airport. There are also seaplanes flying from Hulhule' International Airport to nearby resorts from where people may transfer to the island.

There are two dedicated establishments providing rooms for rent on a daily basis.
