= Velidhoo (Noonu Atoll) =

Velidhoo ވެލިދޫ
- Inhabited island
- Location in Maldives
- Coordinates: 05°39′45″N 73°16′24″E
- Country: Maldives
- Geographic atoll: Miladhummadulhu Atoll
- Administrative atoll: Southern Miladhunmadulu
- Distance to Malé: 166.52 km (89.91 nmi)

Dimensions
  - Length: 1.19 km (0.74 mi)
  - Width: 0.71 km (0.44 mi)

Population (2022)
  - Total: 1,832
- Time zone: UTC+05:00 (MST)
- Website: Official website

Velidhoo (Dhivehi: ވެލިދޫ) is one of the inhabited islands of Noonu Atoll. It is the most populous island in the atoll, with a registered population of 1,832 as of the 2022 census.

== History ==
Velidhoo is an island in the Maldives. The Maldivian islands have been inhabited since at least the 1st century, most likely through migration from parts of South Asia such as India and Sri Lanka.

Archaeological findings and local oral tradition suggest the island has been inhabited for centuries. It is the location of a banyan tree (known locally as the "Velidhoo Bodu Nikagas"), which is estimated by local tradition to be over 300 years old.

Throughout the late 20th and early 21st centuries, Velidhoo has been experiencing an increase in population growth, leading to housing and infrastructure challenges for the island. The local government responded by creating and expanding multiple land reclamation projects aimed at expanding habitable land and supporting key economic activities, particularly fishing and tourism. As of 2010, 14 hectares of land have been reportedly reclaimed for private and public use.

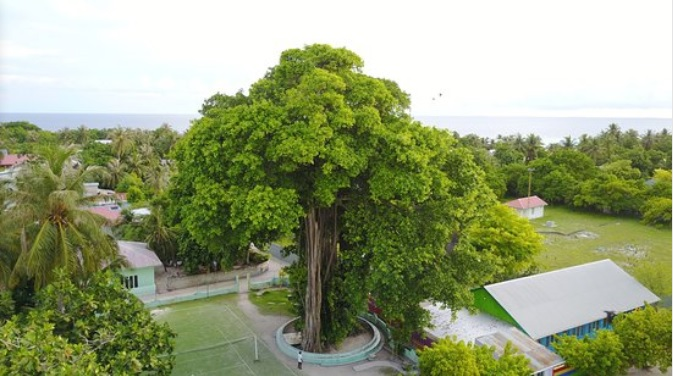
Velidhoo (bodu Nikagas) Velidhoo (Big Banyan Tree)

== Demography ==
Census data shows that the island’s population has continued to grow at a steady rate.

Historical population
Year	Pop.	±%
2006	1,716	—
2014	1,722	+0.3%
2022	1,832	+6.4%
2006–2022: Census populations Source:

== Governance ==
=== Government Offices ===
Several government offices are located on the island, including:

- The Secretariat of the Velidhoo Council, South Miladhunmadulu
- Velidhoo Police Station
- Velidhoo Magistrate Court, South Miladhunmadulu
- Noonu Atoll Education Centre
- Velidhoo Health Centre
- STELCO - Velidhoo Branch
- Maldives Post - Velidhoo Branch
- Bank of Maldives - Velidhoo Branch
- N. Velidhoo Fitness & Recreation Centre

=== Island chiefs ===
Below is a list of individuals who have served as island chiefs, with dates provided where available.

- Katheebu Kaleyge – Muththoshige Gasim Fulhu (late) – Muththosige
- Ibrahim Moosa Kaleyfaanu (Naibu dhonkokko) (late) – Seesange
- Hassan Kaleyfaanu (late) – Muththosige
- Easa Gasim (late) – Daylight
- Mohamed Gasim (late) – Ochidmaage
- Abdul Samed Adam Kaleyfanu – Lubomage (3 September 1977 – 7 April 1982)
- Mohamed Hassan (Magoodhu Mohamed Fulhu) (late) – Dorensyvila (31 March 1970)
- Mohamed Hassan (late)– Muththoshige (3 June 1964 – 9 July 1977)
- Mohamed Abubakur (late) – Hilihilage (19 June 1982 – 31 July 1989)
- Ahmed Waheed (late) (Tholhendhu Waheed) (29 August 1970 – 14 June 1975)
- Abdul Azeez Moosa Kaleyfaanu – Oasanvilla (late) (6 July 1978 – 19 July 1979)
- Ali Moosa Kaleyfanu (late) – Elpaso (6 September 1976 – 16 May 1978)
- Ahmed Wasif (late) – Rediyamge (2 November 1982 – 1 December 1983)
- Moosa Hassanfulhu – Dheyliyaage (17 November 1965 – 1992)
- Abdul Rahman Hussain – Kethi (retired)
- Ibrahim Haleem Ali (late) – Bina (late) (died March 10, 2021)
- Ibrahim Naeem - Waves (retired)

=== First Elected Velidhoo Council - 26 February 2011 ===
- Mohamed Adil - Iramaage (President)
- Ahmed Saeed - Asdhoo (Vice President)
- Ahmed Ziyaad - Maadhuni
- Ahmed Siraaj - France
- Mohamed Faiz - Athiriaage

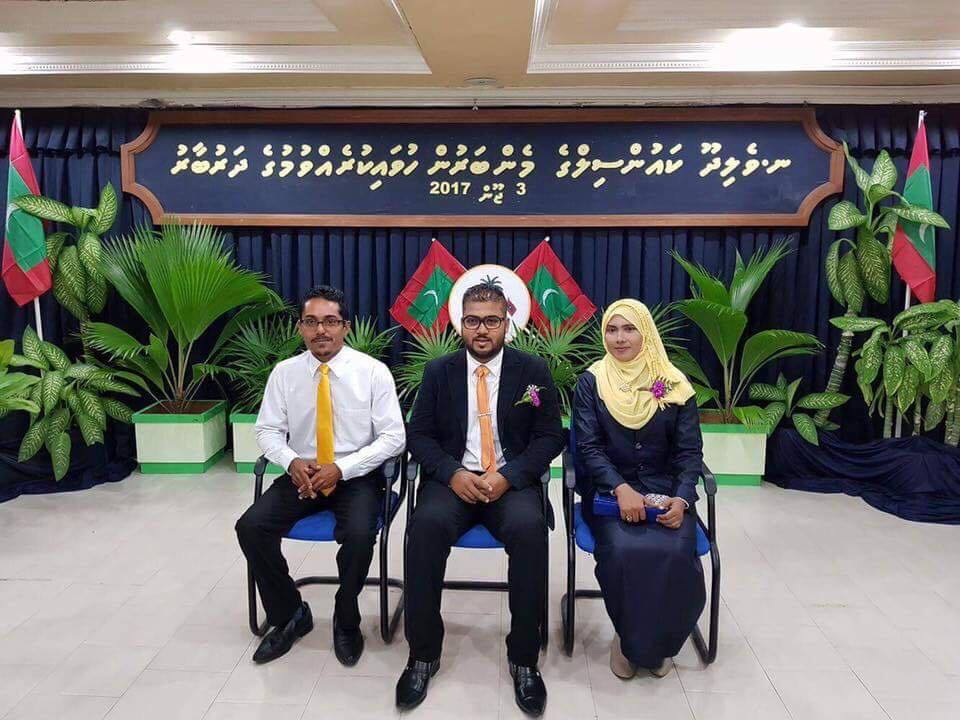
N.Velidhoo council presidents in 2017

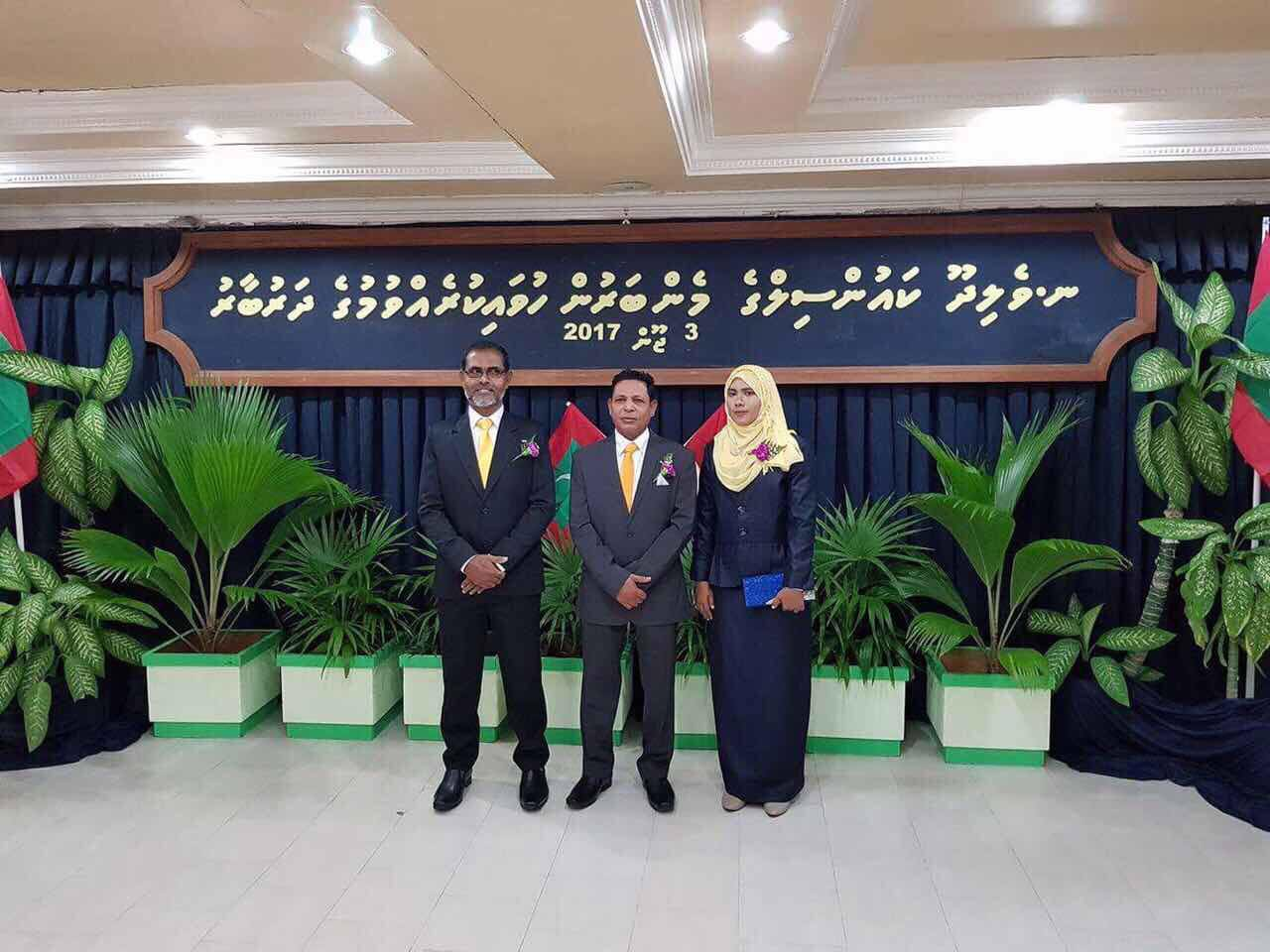
Council from 3 June 2017 till 17 May 2021

=== Second Elected Velidhoo Council - 13 March 2013 ===
- President of council: Ali Ahmeen Boashimaage
- Vice President: Ibrahim Ali Boashimaage
- Councilor: Ali Mujthaba - Kethi
- Councilor: Asma Hussain - Aahama
- Councilor: Ibrahim Qasim - Fashuvimaage

=== Third Elected Velidhoo Council - 3 June 2017 ===
- Asma Hussain - Aahama (President)
- Ahmed Jaufaru - Dearhouse (Vice President)
- Adam Ali - Hasthee (Council Member)

=== Fourth Elected Velidhoo Council - 17 May 2021 ===
- Athif Hussain - Aahama (President)
- Jeehan Mohamed - Aliha (Vice President)
- Haafiza Ibrahim - Azum
- Abdulla Abdul Razzaq - Uraha
- Abdulla Faig - Maahaa.

=== Women's Development Committee - 17 May 2021 ===
- Shareefa Hassan - Janbuge
- Khadheeja Adam - Hive
- Aiminath Suneela - Adha
- Khadheeja Ibrahim - Bahaaruge
- Dhiyana Abdul Razzaq - Uraha

=== Judges ===
- Ibrahim Moosa Kaleyfaanu (Naibu dhonkokko) (late) – Seesange
- Abdul Azeez Moosa Kaleyfaanu
- Ibrahim Haleem
- Mohamed Ibrahimfulhu (Miladhoo Mohamed fulhu)
- Mohamed Haleem

== Wards ==
Velidhoo has a total of three wards: Uthuru (north), Dhekunu (south), and Fasgan'du (reclaimed land).

== Transportation ==
A new harbour was opened by President Abdulla Yameen in 2017. The harbour, built by the Maldives Transport and Contracting Company (MTCC).

In November 2021, the Velidhoo Road Development Project was announced. The project intends to develop 5 kilometers of roads across Velidhoo Island.

There are several passengers, supplies, and speed boats operating between Velidhoo and the capital of Maldives, Malé. Air transport is also available from Maafaru International Airport and directly from Velidhoo.

=== Air Transport ===
- Flights from Maafaru International Airport.
- Direct seaplane transfer between Malé and Velidhoo.

=== Atoll Transport Service ===
The Raajje Transport Link (RTL), operated by the MTCC, provides a public ferry service in Maldives with high-speed speedboat ferries. Currently, the service operates in Noonu Atoll, with a route that connects the island of Velidhoo to the islands of Fodhdhoo, Holhudhoo, Magoodhoo, and Manadhoo.

=== Public Transport Service ===
There are several speed boat ferries and supply boats that travel between Malé to Velidhoo and other nearby islands.

==== Speed Boat Ferries ====
- Hope Travels
- Legion Travels
- Zuhal Express
- Flying Fish

==== Supply Boats ====
- Concord Express
- Blue Marine - 9
- Royal 10
- Life Line
- Sosun Express

== Education ==
The Noonu Atoll Education Centre (NAEC) in Velidhoo, opened in 1981 and teaches students from LKG (Lower Kindergarten) to Grade 11.

== Health ==
The main healthcare medical centre is the government run Velidhoo Health Centre, along with the SPMSCL Pharmacy.
