= Gemendhoo =

Gemendhoo as a place name may refer to:

- Gemendhoo (Baa Atoll), Maldives
- Gemendhoo (Dhaalu Atoll), Maldives
- Gemendhoo (Noonu Atoll), an island of the Maldives
