= Maaenboodhoo =

Maaenboodhoo މާއެނބޫދޫ
- Inhabited Island
- Location in Maldives
- Coordinates: 02°41′45″N 72°57′45″E
- Country: Maldives
- Administrative atoll: Dhaalu Atoll
- Distance to Malé: 174.5 km (108.4 mi)

Dimensions
  - Length: 0.975 km (0.606 mi)
  - Width: 0.350 km (0.217 mi)

Population (2022)
  - Total: 679
- Time zone: UTC+05:00 (MST)

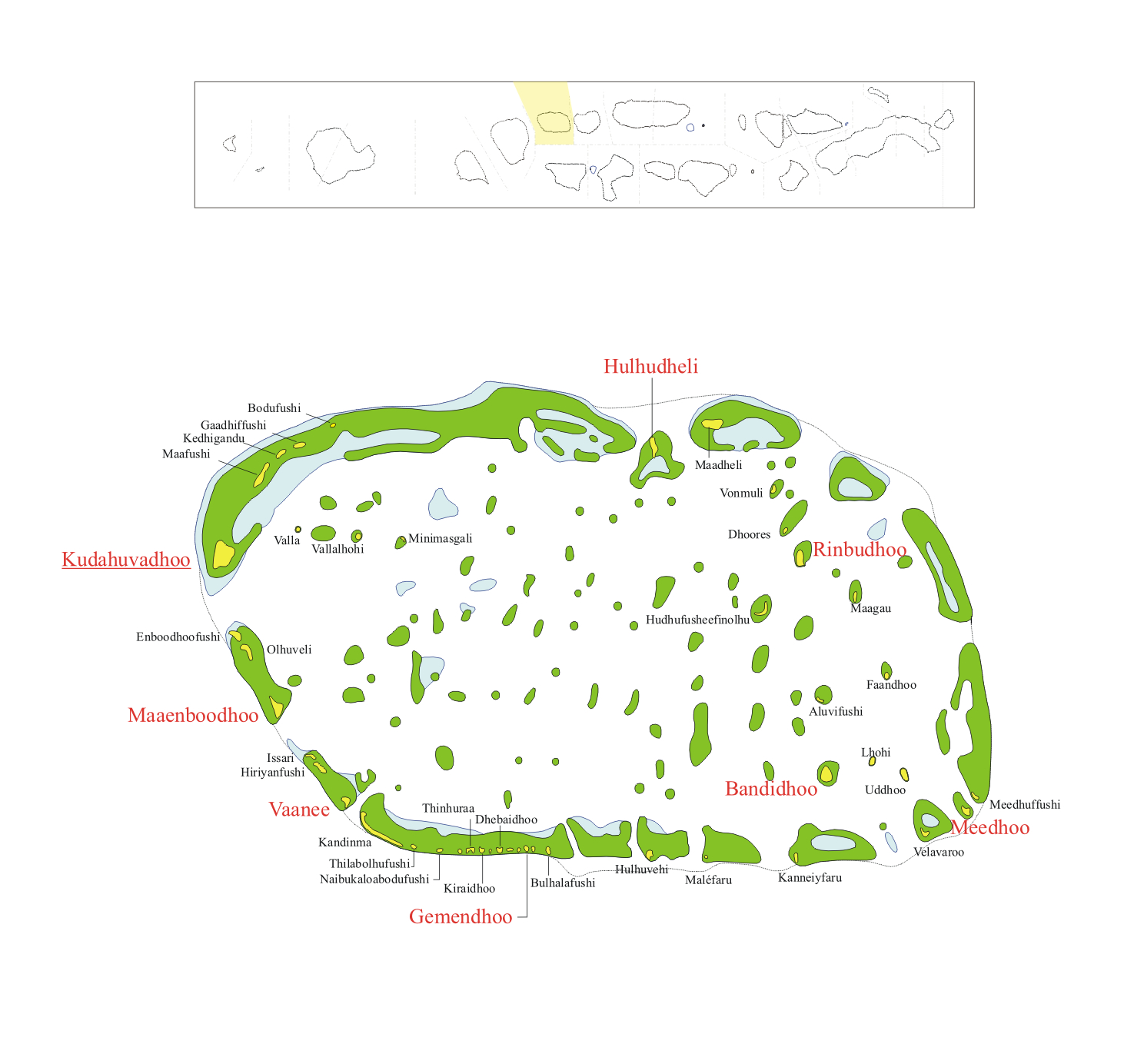
Dhaalu Atoll Islands, the Maldives.

Maaenboodhoo (Dhivehi: މާއެނބޫދޫ) is one of the inhabited islands of Dhaalu Atoll in the Maldives.

== Geography ==
The island is 174.5 km (108 mi; 94 nmi) south of the Maldivian capital, Malé. It is the Closest island to Kudahuvadhoo. it is located on the southern fringe of the atoll, Along with Kudahuvadhoo and Vaanee.

== Demography ==
Historical population
Year	Pop.	±%
2006	600	—
2014	591	−1.5%
2022	679	+14.9%
2006-2022: Census populations Source:

== Infrastructure ==
The layout of the buildings in the Island closely resemble that of Kudahuvadhoo. The island has a mosque called Maaenboodhoo Miskiyy, as well as a school and a pre-school located on the northern side of the Island. Maaenboodhoo also has its own health center located in the middle-western side of the island. Maaenboodhoo also has a football field and a few stores across the island. The eastern side of the island is quite rural, having no buildings on it.
