= Lhohi (Noonu Atoll) =

Lhohi ޅޮހި
- Inhabited island
- Location in Maldives
- Coordinates: 05°48′50″N 73°22′39″E
- Country: Maldives
- Geographic atoll: Miladhummadulhu Atoll
- Administrative atoll: Southern Miladhunmadulu
- Distance to Malé: 181.79 km (112.96 mi)

Dimensions
  - Length: 0.980 km (0.609 mi)
  - Width: 0.500 km (0.311 mi)

Population (2022)
  - Total: 692
- Time zone: UTC+05:00 (MST)

Lhohi (Dhivehi: ޅޮހި) is one of the islands of Noonu Atoll in the Maldives with a population of around 900 people.

== History ==
On Lhohi, there is a place called "hanguraama fasgandu" where the Portuguese and Maldivians fought.

== Geography ==
The island is 181.79 km (113 mi; 98 nmi) north of the country's capital, Malé. Lhohi is located near Manadhoo, the capital of Noonu atoll. Manadhoo, Miladhoo and Magoodhoo are the nearest populated islands. The nearest island is a small island called Ganbilivaadhoo.

== Demography ==
Historical population
Year	Pop.	±%
2006	552	—
2014	576	+4.3%
2022	692	+20.1%
2006-2014-2022: Census populations Source:
