= Lhohi =

Lhohi as a place name may refer to:

- Lhohi (Dhaalu Atoll) (Republic of Maldives)
- Lhohi (Lhaviyani Atoll) (Republic of Maldives)
- Lhohi (Noonu Atoll) (Republic of Maldives)
- Lhohi (Raa Atoll) (Republic of Maldives)
