= Maafaru =

Maafaru may refer to the following islands in the Maldives:

- Maafaru (Noonu Atoll)
- Maafaru (Raa Atoll), an island of the Maldives
