= Meedhoo (Dhaalu Atoll) =

Meedhoo މީދޫ
- Inhabited island

- Location in Maldives
- Coordinates: 2°59′53″N 73°0′24″E
- Country: Maldives
- Geographic atoll: Nilandhe Atholhu
- Administrative atoll: Dhaalu Atoll
- Distance to Malé: 141.63 km (88.00 mi)

Dimensions
  - Length: 0.450 km (0.280 mi)
  - Width: 0.275 km (0.171 mi)

Population (2022)
  - Total: 1,118
- Time zone: UTC+05:00 (MST)

Meedhoo (Dhivehi: މީދޫ) is one of the inhabited islands of Dhaalu Atoll.

== Geography ==
Meedhoo is an island in Dhaalu Atoll. It is the northernmost inhabited island in the Dhaalu Atoll. The island is closer to Nilandhoo, than to Kudahuvadhoo, the capital of the atoll. The island is 141.63 km (88 mi; 76 nmi) southwest of the country's capital, Malé. A land reclamation project was initiated in 2014, with the dredging contract awarded to Boskalis to add 17.5 ha (43 acres) of land to the island of Meedhoo.

== Demography ==
Historical population
Year	Pop.	±%
2006	919	—
2014	870	−5.3%
2022	1,118	+28.5%
2006-2022: Census populations Source:

== Economy ==
The main economical work done in the island is fishing. However construction is developing rapidly as people have started to erect storied houses due to lack of land in the island. In addition some people have been working in nearby tourist resorts since tourism was introduced in the atoll in 1998.

The island has 3 mosques for men, (Masjid Salam, Masjid Zikra and Masjid Aboobakr Al Siddeeq) and 2 mosques for women. There is an island office, [Secretariat of the Meedhoo Council] and a court and a health centre. There is 1 school [Dhaalu Atholhu Madharusa] which teaches from grade 1-12 and a pre-school [Meedhoo Pre-School].

There are no land line telephones on the island except in the island office and the school. However, there is good reception of both Dhiraagu and Wataniya Telecom Maldives networks for mobile phones. There are two phone boxes in the island. TVM Television Maldives including other local television channels such as Raajje TV can be viewed in the island. There are 9 shops and 6 guest shops in the island. In addition two private parties supply gas and staple food items (rice, wheat flour and sugar in the Maldives) to the islanders. The power house is owned by the public until 2011 and was changed to the Central Utilities Limited. 24 hour electricity service is provided.

Meedhoo was severely hit by the 2004 tsunami. However the people have worked hard to come back to normal and the island is a fast developing island compared to the other islands in the Maldives. The main threat for the development of the island is its size. Being less than a square kilometer, the island is already overcrowded and there is virtually no land at all for economic activities and building. As a result, the people have started to build houses with 2 or 3 floors. Further, as the island was severely hit by the tsunami the islanders had a tendency to build storied houses as a mean protection. Soil erosion has been another threat for the islanders. However the government has taken some actions to prevent this problem and an area of about 50 feet has been reclaimed around the island in 2006.

== Transport ==
The island has a natural harbor with comparatively easy access and during early 1960 a jetty was erected which was made of woods and limestone composed from coral. During late 1990s the islanders constructed a small harbor for loading and unloading of goods and to facilitate easy transportation. However, due to increased economic activities and due to raise in number of larger fishing vessels, during the Government of President Mohamed Nasheed, construction of a new harbor was initiated under the government safe harbor project. On 7 February 2011 Ministry of Finance and Treasury announced to find a contractor for the project and the project was awarded to MT Højgaard. The construction work was fully completed on early 2012 and was formally opened for operation on 6 May 2012.

== Gallery ==
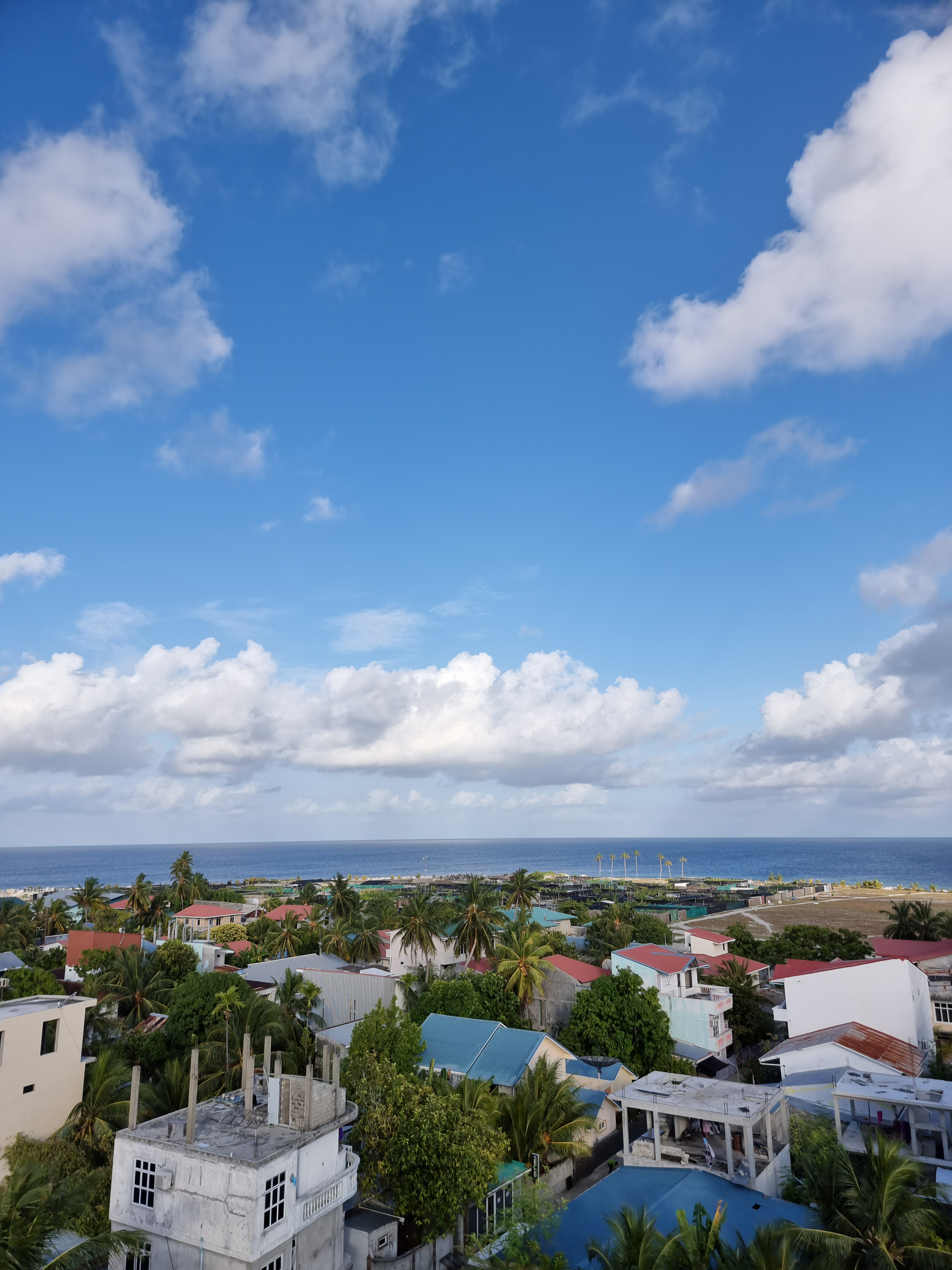

New School building erected under the aid of UNICEF: Officials from Meedhoo and UNICEF at the opening ceremony.

Construction group at work

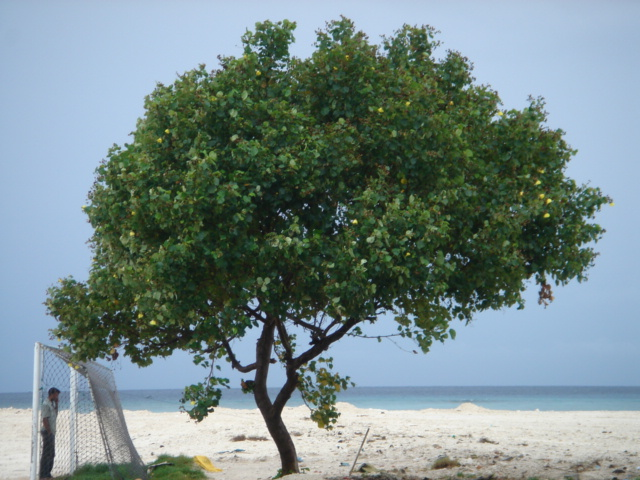
Meedhoo land reclamation area
