= Manta Air =

Airline of the Maldives

IATA	ICAO	Call sign
NR	MAV	SEA WING
- Founded: 2018; 8 years ago
- Commenced operations: 24 February 2019; 7 years ago
- Hubs: Dhaalu Airport
- Fleet size: 21
- Destinations: 06
- Key people: Mohamed Khaleel (CEO)
- Employees: 250
- Website: mantaair.mv

Manta Air is a Maldivian airline based in the Maldives, which began its operations on 24 February 2019. It began international operations in 2024.

== History ==
Manta Air had its first aircraft delivered on 12 November 2018, and the airline was unveiled to the Maldives on 22 November 2018 by the Vice President of the Maldives, Faisal Naseem.

Manta Air received the Air Operator's Certificate on 21 February 2019 and officially started its operations on 24 February 2019.

Manta Air began its float-plane (seaplane) operations on 17 November 2019.

== Destinations ==
Manta Air flies is reportedly ceasing its domestic operations to switch exclusively to Seaplane operations.

Seaplane destinations
Commonwealth	Destination	Notes	Ref
Maldives	Soneva Fushi		

Ceased operations (reportedly)

Commonwealth	City	Airport	Notes	Ref
Maldives	Malé	Velana International Airport	Terminated	
Maldives	Kudahuvadhoo	Dhaalu Airport	Terminated	
India	Bengaluru	Kempegowda	Terminated	

== Fleet ==
As of September 2026, Manta Air operates the following aircraft:

Manta Air fleet
Aircraft	In service	Order	Passengers	Remark
ATR 72-600	1		64	Leased from Nordic Aviation Capital
DHC-6-300 Twin Otter	16		15	—
DHC-6-200 Twin Otter	2		15	—
Total	21	-		

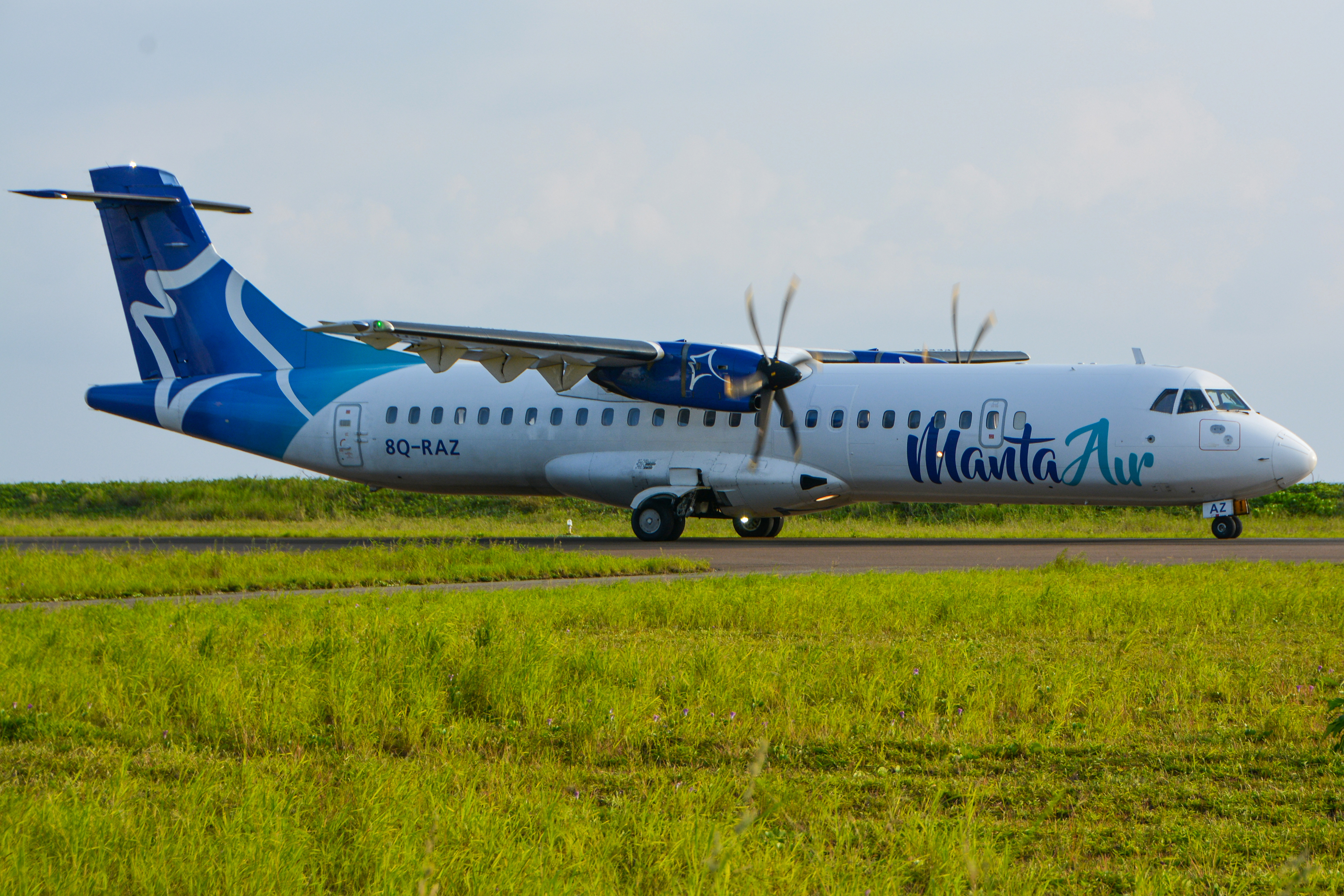
ATR 72-600 of Manta Air

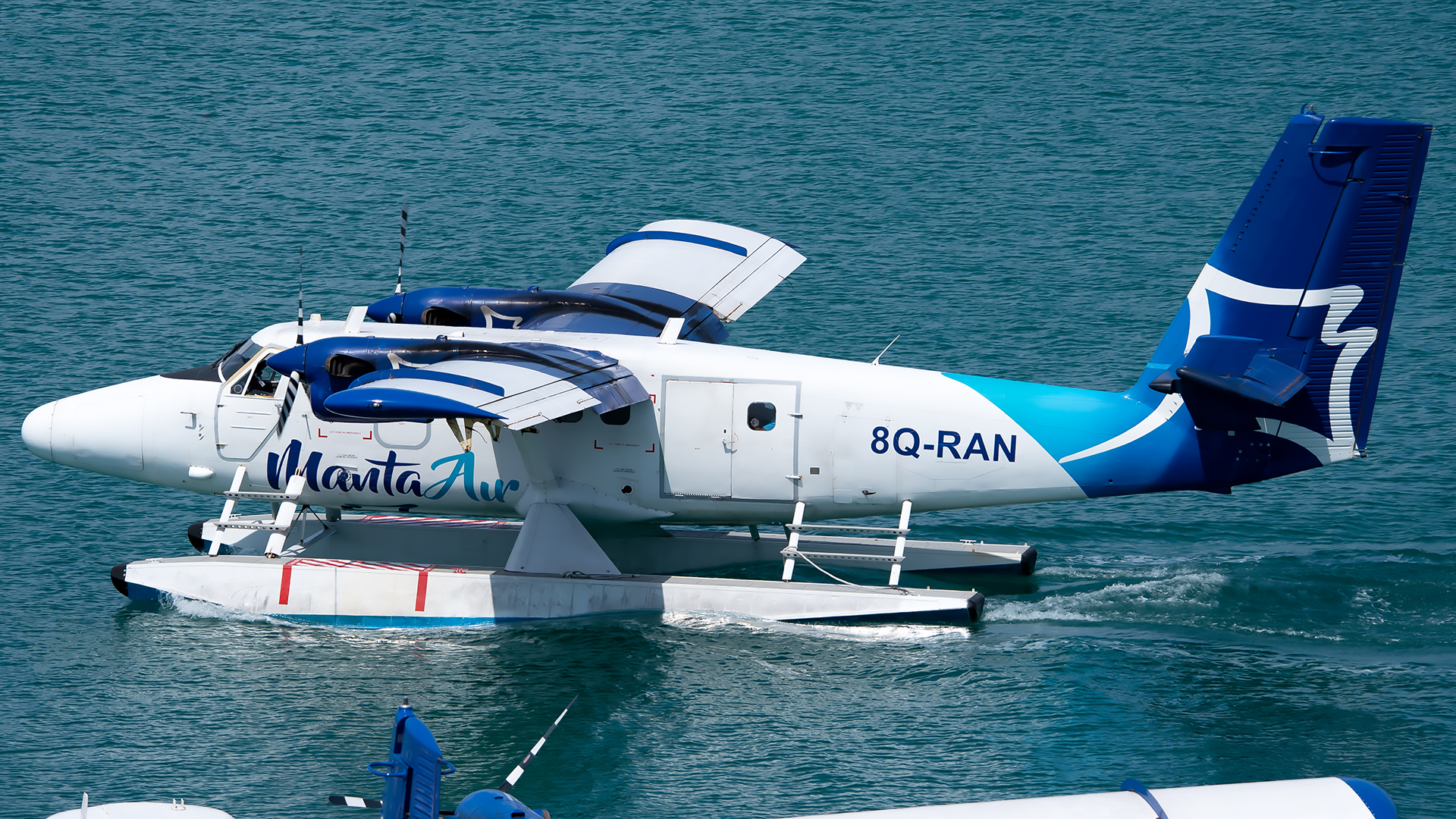
DHC-6-300 Twin Otter of Manta Air

Manta Air Historic fleet
Aircraft	fleet	introduced	Retired	Replacement aircraft	Remark
ATR 72-600	2	2019	2026	—	—
DHC-6-300 Twin Otter	1	2021	2024	—	—
Beechcraft 1900	1	2022	2023	—	—
