= Velidhoo =

Velidhoo may refer to the following places in the Maldives:

- Velidhoo (Alif Alif Atoll)
- Velidhoo (Noonu Atoll)
