= Dhaalu =

Dhaalu may refer to:

- Dhaalu Atoll, an administrative division of the Maldives.
- Dhaalu, the 12th consonant of the Thaana abugida used in Dhivehi.
