= Olhuveli =

Olhuveli as a place name may refer to:

- Olhuveli (Dhaalu Atoll) (Republic of Maldives)
- Olhuveli (Kaafu Atoll) (Republic of Maldives)
- Olhuveli (Laamu Atoll) (Republic of Maldives)
