= Rinbudhoo =

Rin'budhoo ރިނބުދޫ
- Inhabited island

- Location in Maldives
- Coordinates: 02°55′30″N 72°53′45″E
- Country: Maldives
- Administrative atoll: Dhaalu Atoll
- Distance to Malé: 154.12 km (95.77 mi)

Dimensions
  - Length: 0.950 km (0.590 mi)
  - Width: 0.325 km (0.202 mi)

Population (2022)
  - Total: 316
- Time zone: UTC+05:00 (MST)

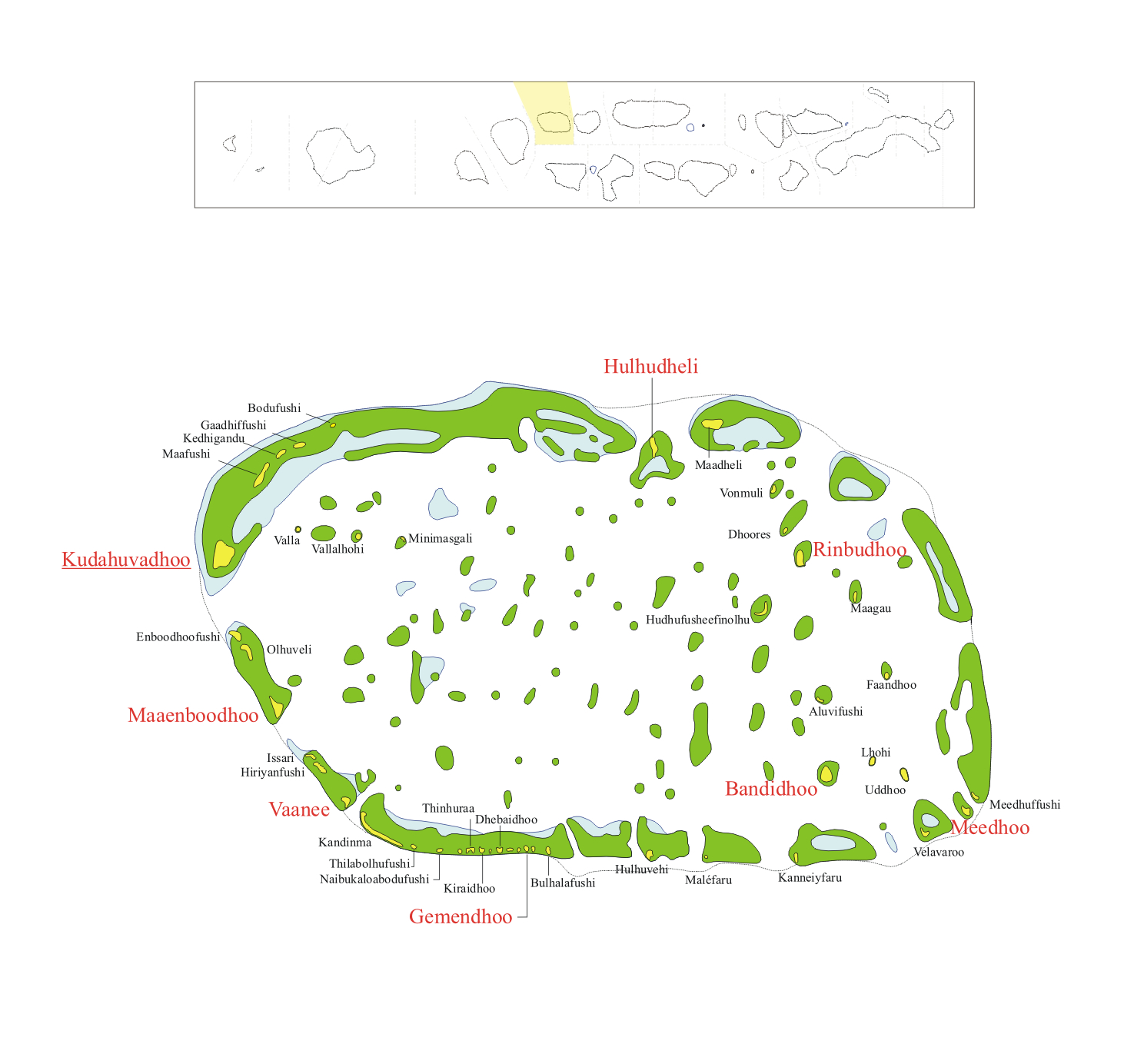
Map of Dhaalu Atoll

Rinbudhoo, (Dhivehi: ރިނބުދޫ) is one of the inhabited islands of Dhaalu Atoll.

== Jobs ==
The people of Rinbudhoo are among the most skilled silver and goldsmiths in the Maldives. The islanders earn money in several ways like fishing, jewellery making, construction works etc.

== Geography ==
The island is 154.12 km (96 mi; 83 nmi) southwest of the country's capital, Malé.

== Demography ==
Rinbudhoo was affected by the 2004 tsunami and 2 people were dead.

Historical population
| Year | Pop. | ±% |
|---|---|---|
| 2006 | 207 | — |
| 2014 | 255 | +23.2% |
| 2022 | 316 | +23.9% |
2006–2022: Census populations Source:
