= Dhaalu Airport =

Airport in Kudahuvadhoo, the Maldives

Dhaalu Airport ދާލު އެއާރޕޯޓް
- IATA: DDD; ICAO: VRMU

Summary
- Airport type: Public
- Owner: Reollo Investments Pvt. Ltd
- Operator: Dhaalu Airport Holdings
- Serves: Dhaalu Atoll, Maldives
- Location: Kudahuvadhoo
- Elevation AMSL: 6 ft (1.8 m)
- Coordinates: 02°40′02″N 072°53′34″E
- Website: www.dhaalu-airport.com

Map
- Location in Maldives

Runways
Direction	Length		Surface
Direction	m	ft	Surface
10/28	1,800	5,906	Asphalt

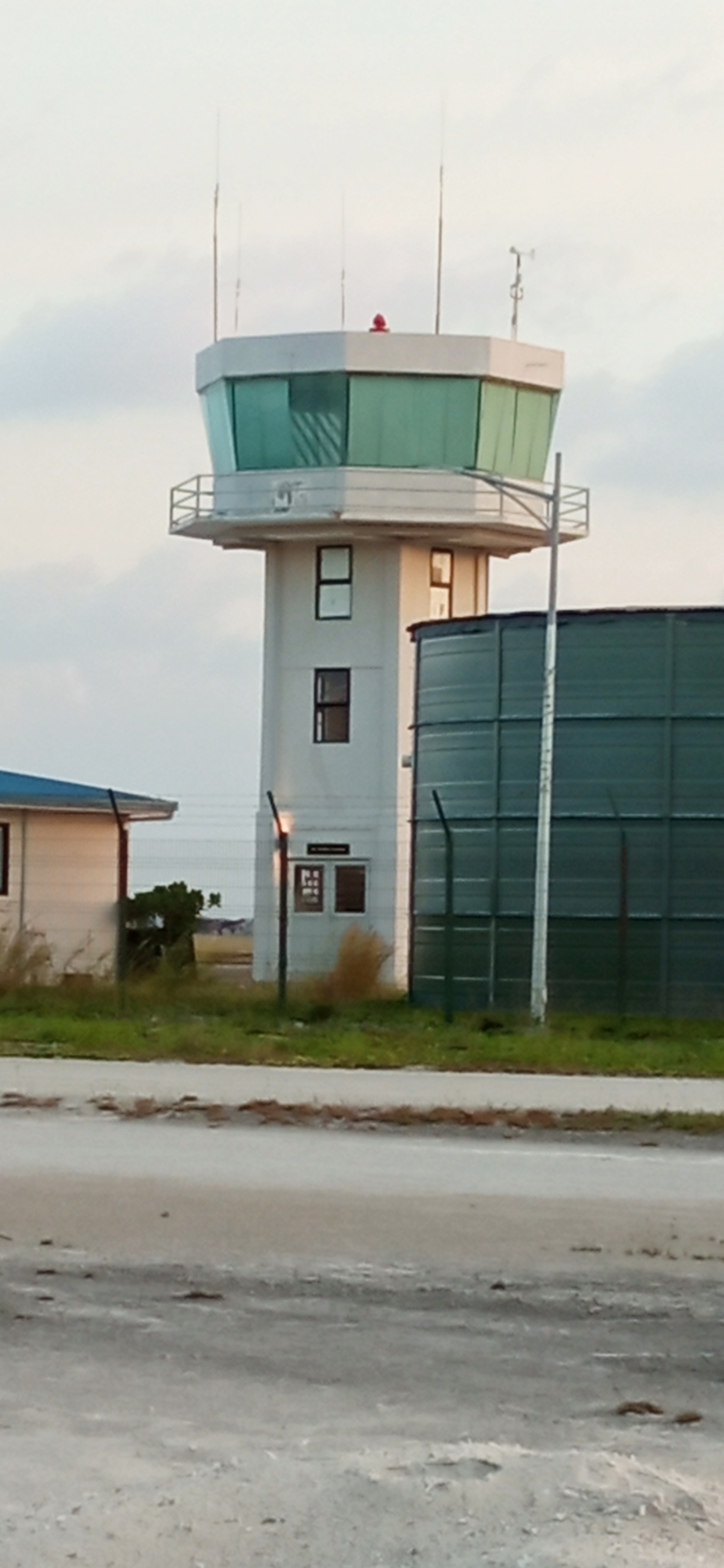
Dhaalu Airport, Republic of Maldives

Dhaalu Airport (IATA: DDD, ICAO: VRMU) is an international airport located on the island of Kudahuvadhoo in Dhaalu Atoll in the Republic of Maldives. It was built by Reollo Investments Pvt. Ltd. and is operated by Dhaalu Airport Holdings.

== History ==
The airport began operations in 2017, with the first aircraft landing at Dhaalu Airport on June 1, 2017. International flights will be started from this airport to India in January 2024.

== Facilities ==
The airport was built entirely on 63 hectares of reclaimed land and features a runway of 1,800 metres allowing it to accommodate Dash-8 and ATR-72 aircraft as well as large private jets.

Dhaalu Airport is the first airport in Maldives to make extensive use of solar airfield lighting.

Currently, Manta Air is the only airline offering scheduled service at the airport.

== Airlines and destinations ==
Airline	Destinations	Notes	Ref
Manta Air	Malé, Bangalore	Terminated	
Maldivian	Malé		
