= Hulhudheli =

Hulhudheli ހުޅުދެލި
- Inhabited island
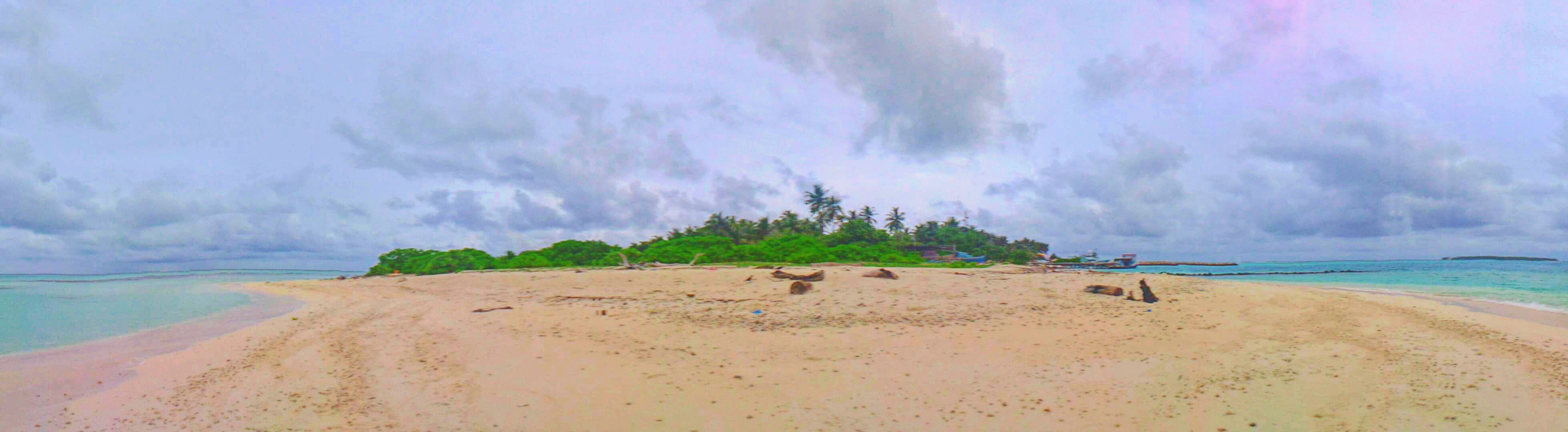

- Location in Maldives
- Coordinates: 02°51′30″N 72°50′55″E
- Country: Maldives
- Administrative atoll: Dhaalu Atoll
- Distance to Malé: 163.06 km (101.32 mi)

Dimensions
  - Length: 0.950 km (0.590 mi)
  - Width: 0.300 km (0.186 mi)

Population (2022)
  - Total: 764
- Time zone: UTC+05:00 (MST)

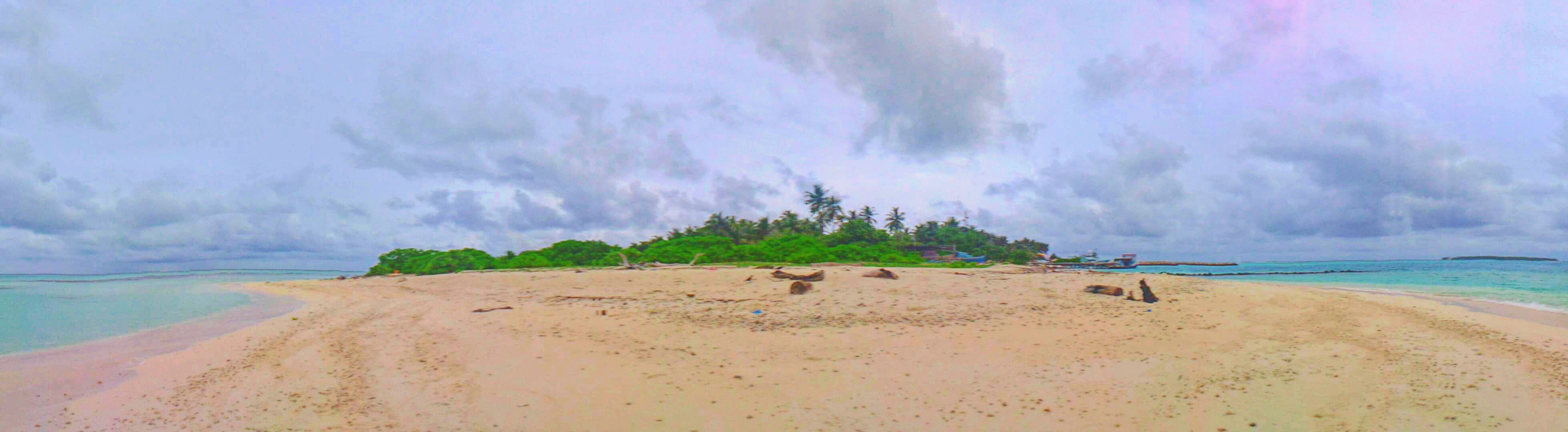
Hulhudeli island

Hulhudheli (Dhivehi: ހުޅުދެލި) is one of the inhabited islands of Dhaalu Atoll.

People of Hulhudheli are among the most skilled silversmiths in the Maldives.

== Geography ==
The island is 163.06 km (101 mi; 88 nmi) southwest of the country's capital, Malé.

== Demography ==
Historical population
Year	Pop.	±%
2006	566	—
2014	681	+20.3%
2022	764	+12.2%
2006-2022: Census populations Source:
