= Aloofushi =

Coordinates: 2°56′01″N 72°57′40″E

Aloofushi Aluvifushi
- uninhabited island
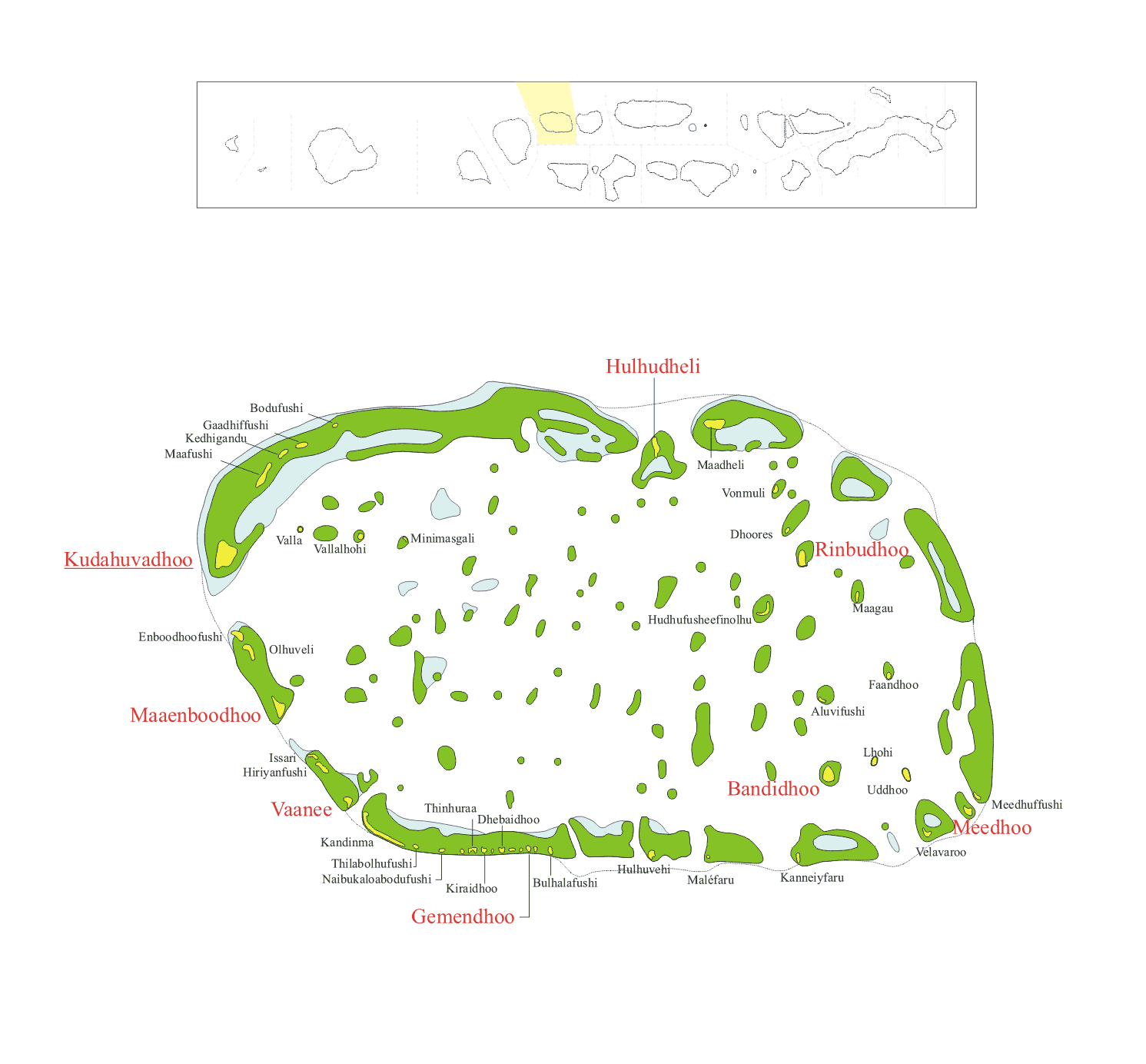
- Location of Aloofushi and Dhaalu Atoll

- Location in Maldives
- Country: Maldives
- Administrative atoll: Dhaalu Atoll
- Distance to Malé: 147.97 km (91.94 mi)

Population
  - Total: 0
- Time zone: UTC+05:00 (MST)

Aloofushi or Aluvifushi is one of the uninhabited islands of Dhaalu Atoll in the Maldives.
