= Ayyakaloahuraa =

- uninhabited island
- Location in Maldives
- Coordinates: 2°47′38″N 73°1′32″E
- Country: Maldives
- Administrative atoll: Dhaalu Atoll
- Distance to Malé: 162.74 km (101.12 mi)

Area
  - Total: 5.30 ha (13.1 acres)

Population
  - Total: 0
  - Density: 0.0/km^{2} (0.0/sq mi)
- Time zone: UTC+05:00 (MST)

Ayyakaloahuraa (Dhivehi: އައްޔަކަލޯހުރާ) is an uninhabited island with an area of 5.3 ha (13 acres) that is located in Dhaalu Atoll, Maldives. The island is located on the eastern fringe of the atoll and is surrounded by a long line of 11 uninhabited islands. The route through these islands from Bulhalafushi (to the north) which ends approximately 7 kilometers away at Naibukaloabodufushi (to the south) can be walked in low tide.
