= Vaanee =

- Uninhabited island
- Location in Maldives
- Coordinates: 02°43′35″N 73°00′10″E
- Country: Maldives
- Administrative atoll: Dhaalu Atoll
- Distance to Malé: 169.8 km (105.5 mi)

Dimensions
  - Length: 0.630 km (0.391 mi)
  - Width: 0.475 km (0.295 mi)
- Time zone: UTC+05:00 (MST)

Vaanee (Dhivehi: ވާނީ) is one of the uninhabited islands of Dhaalu Atoll.

== History ==
The island was highly affected by the Boxing Day Tsunami of 2004.

The people of Vaane were once moved to Kudahuvadhoo, which they protested and went back to Vaanee, then a few years later, they willingly went to Kudahuvadhoo.

== Geography ==
The island is 169.8 km (106 mi; 92 nmi) south of the country's capital, Malé.

== Demography ==
Vaanee used to be an inhabited Island, however the population willingly relocated to the nearby island of Kudahuvadhoo.

Historical population
Year	Pop.	±%
2006	211	—
2014	-	—
2006-2014-: Census populations Source: <r
