= Henbadhoo =

Henbadhoo ހެނބަދޫ
- Inhabited island
- Location in Maldives
- Coordinates: 05°58′03″N 73°23′36″E
- Country: Maldives
- Geographic atoll: Miladhummadulhu Atoll
- Administrative atoll: Southern Miladhunmadulu
- Distance to Malé: 198.60 km (123.40 mi)

Dimensions
  - Length: 0.650 km (0.404 mi)
  - Width: 0.550 km (0.342 mi)

Population (2022)
  - Total: 638
- Time zone: UTC+05:00 (MST)

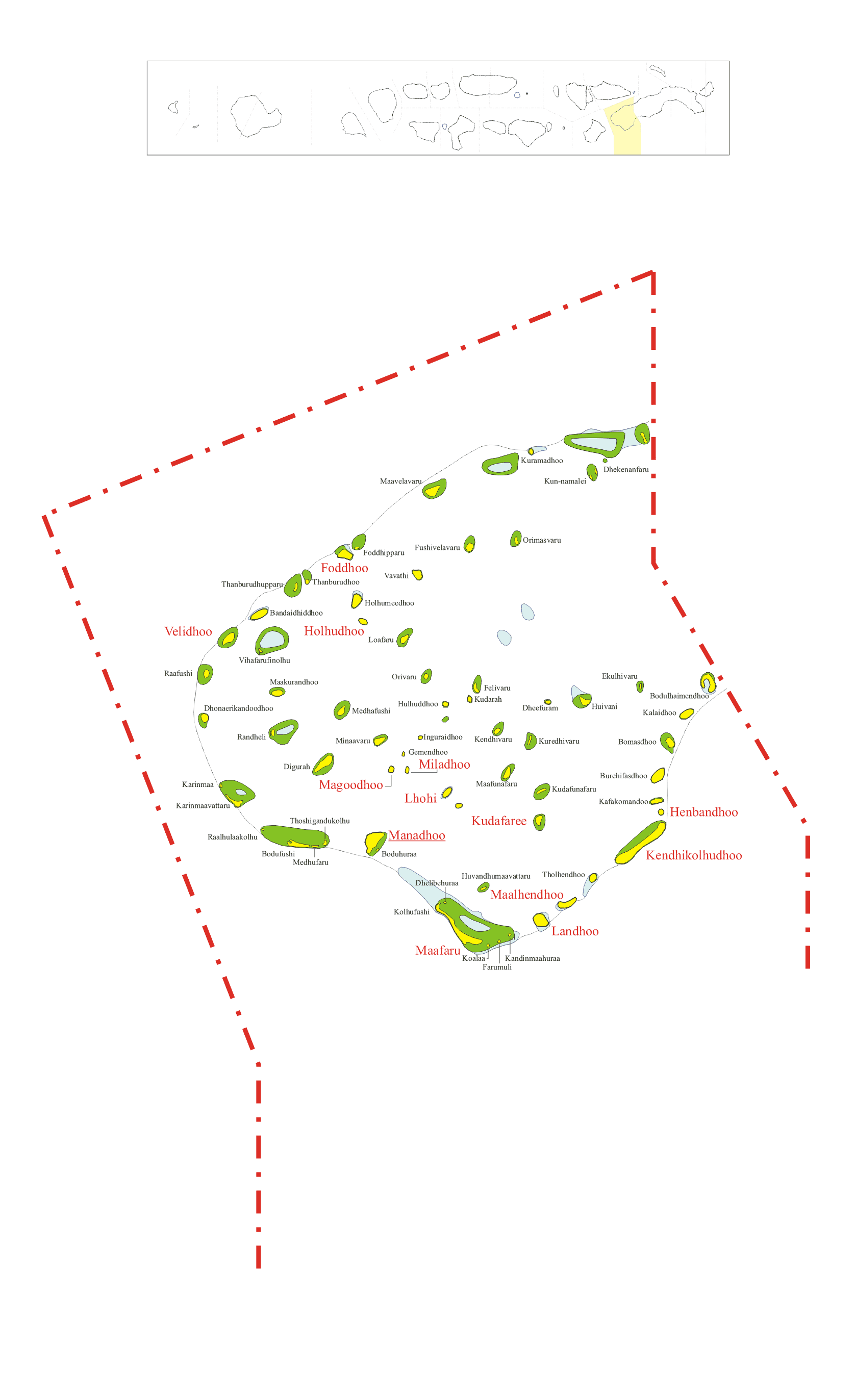
Map of Noonu Atoll

Henbadhoo (Dhivehi: ހެނބަދޫ) is one of the inhabited islands of Noonu Atoll.

== Geography ==
The island is 198.60 km (123 mi; 107 nmi) north of the country's capital, Malé.

== Demography ==
Historical population
Year	Pop.	±%
2006	396	—
2014	478	+20.7%
2022	638	+33.5%
2006-2014-2022: Census populations Source:
