= Landhoo =

Landhoo ލަންދޫ
- Inhabited island
- Location in Maldives
- Coordinates: 05°52′44″N 73°28′04″E
- Country: Maldives
- Geographic atoll: Miladhummadulhu Atoll
- Administrative atoll: Southern Miladhunmadulu
- Distance to Malé: 188.45 km (117.10 mi)

Dimensions
  - Length: 1.245 km (0.774 mi)
  - Width: 1.040 km (0.646 mi)

Population (2022)
  - Total: 757
- Time zone: UTC+05:00 (MST)

Landhoo (Dhivehi: ލަންދޫ) is one of the inhabited islands of Southern Miladhunmadulhu Atoll, administrative code Noonu Atoll.

== History ==
=== Archaeology ===
This island has large ruins from the historical Maldivian Buddhist era. On the northwest side of the island there is an ancient mound known as "Maabadhige Haitha" by the local people. This is the ruins of a Buddhist Stupa. The diameter of the mound is 292 feet and the height is 28 feet.

The remains in this island are probably the single most important Buddhist ruins in the Northern region of the Maldives.

== Geography ==
The island is 188.45 km (117 mi; 102 nmi) north of the country's capital, Malé.

== Demography ==
Historical population
Year	Pop.	±%
2006	582	—
2014	652	+12.0%
2022	757	+16.1%
2006-2014-2022: Census populations Source:
