= Maalhendhoo =

Maalhendhoo މާޅެންދޫ
- Inhabited island
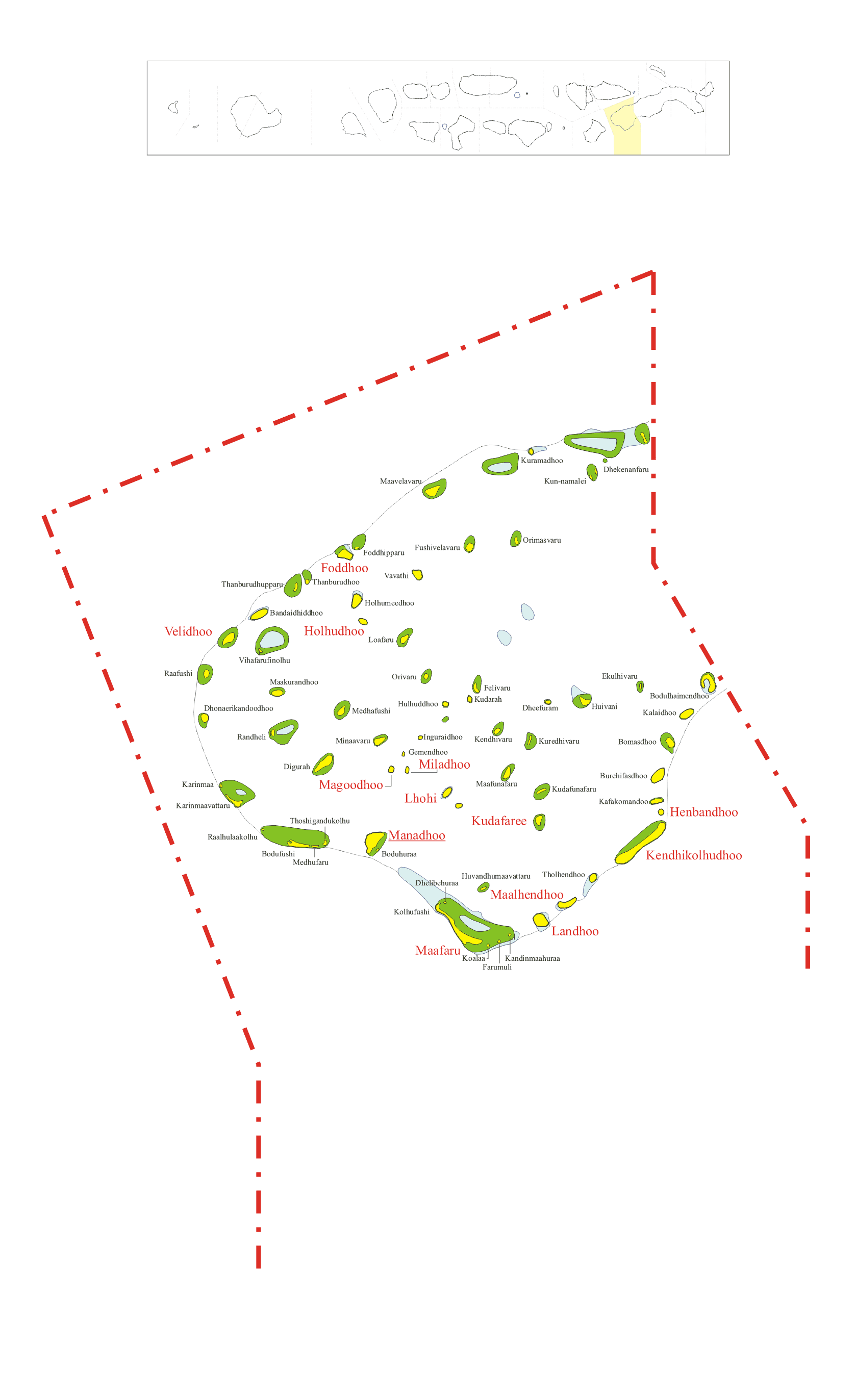
- Map of Noonu Atoll, 2006

- Location in Maldives
- Coordinates: 05°54′00″N 73°27′30″E
- Country: Maldives
- Geographic atoll: Miladhummadulhu Atoll
- Administrative atoll: Southern Miladhunmadulu
- Distance to Malé: 190.81 km (118.56 mi)

Dimensions
  - Length: 1.430 km (0.889 mi)
  - Width: 0.500 km (0.311 mi)

Population (2022)
  - Total: 724
- Time zone: UTC+05:00 (MST)

Maalhendhoo (Dhivehi: މާޅެންދޫ) is one of the inhabited islands of Noonu Atoll.

== Geography ==
The island is 190.81 km (119 mi; 103 nmi) north of the country's capital, Malé.

== Demography ==
Historical population
Year	Pop.	±%
2006	561	—
2014	633	+12.8%
2022	724	+14.4%
2006-2014-2022: Census populations Source:
