= Noonu Atoll =

Coordinates: 5°50′N 73°18′E

- Atoll of the Maldives
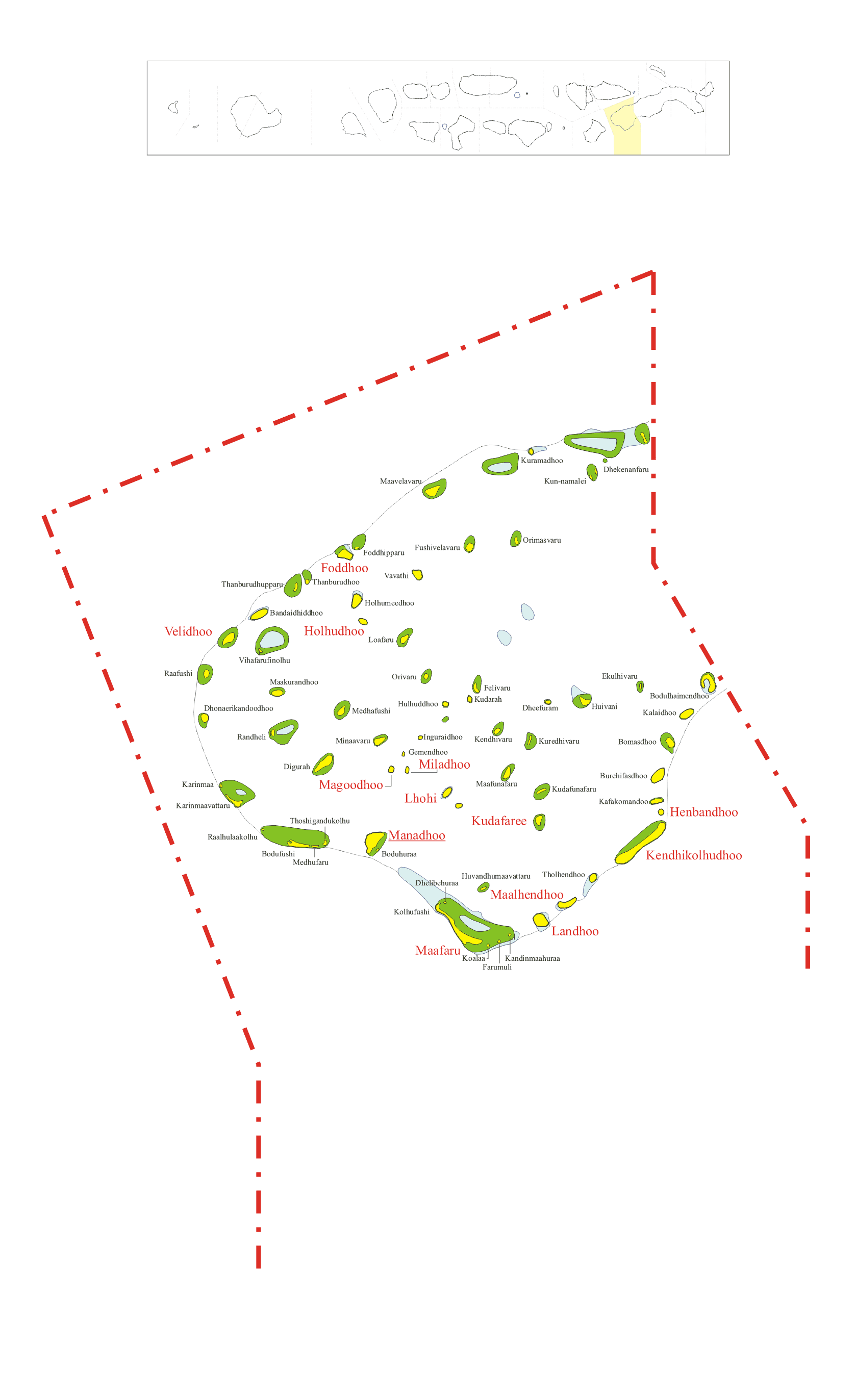

- Location of Noonu in Maldives
- Country: Maldives
- Corresponding geographic atoll(s): Miladhunmadulu Dhekunuburi
- Location: 5°58' N and 5°38' N
- Capital: Manadhoo

Population
  - Total: 12,503
- Letter code: D
- Dhivehi letter code: N (ނ)
  - Number of islands: 71
  - Inhabited islands: Foddhoo Henbandhoo Holhudhoo Kendhikolhudhoo Kudafaree Landhoo Lhohi Maafaru ¤ Maalhendhoo Magoodhoo Manadhoo Miladhoo Velidhoo
  - Uninhabited islands: Badadhidhdhoo, Bodufushi, Bodulhaimendhoo, Bomasdhoo, Burehifasdhoo, Dheefuram, Dhelibehuraa, Dhekenanfaru, Dhigurah, Dhonaerikandoodhoo, Ekulhivaru, Farumuli, Felivaru, Fodhidhipparu, Fushivelavaru, Gemendhoo, Goanbilivaadhoo, Holhumeedhoo, Huivani, Hulhudhdhoo, Huvadhumaavattaru, Iguraidhoo, Kuddarah, Kadimmahuraa, Kalaidhoo, Karimma, Kedhivaru, Koalaa, Kolhufushi, Kudafunafaru, Kudafushi, Kunnamaloa, Kuramaadhoo, Kuredhivaru, Loafaru, Maafunafaru, Maakurandhoo, Maavelavaru, Medhafushi, Medhufaru, Minaavaru, Orimasvaru, Orivaru, Raafushi, Randheli, Thaburudhoo, Thaburudhuffaru, Tholhendhoo, Thoshigadukolhu, Vattaru, Vavathi, Vihafarufinolhu
- Resort islands(*), airports(¤) and industrial islands are also considered uninhabited.

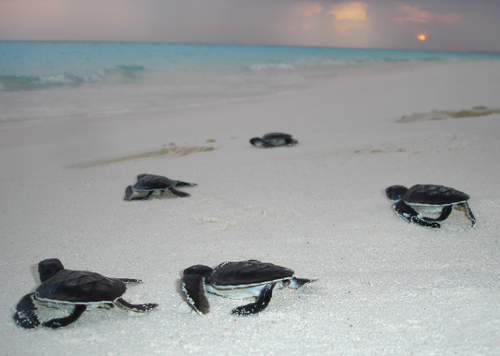
Green turtle hatchlings making their way to the sea on the uninhabited island on Loafaru in Noonu Atoll

Noonu Atoll (also known as Southern Miladhunmadulu Atoll or Miladhunmadulu Dhekunuburi) is an administrative division of the Maldives corresponding to the southern section of Miladhunmadulu Atoll. The capital is Manadhoo. The total population of Noonu Atoll according to Census 2022 is 12503 which is 2% of the national population.

== Administration of South Miladhunmadulu Atoll ==
The Administrative Divisions of the Maldives refers to the various units of government that provide local government services in the Maldives. According to the Decentralization Act 2010, the administrative divisions of the Maldives would consist of atolls, islands, and cities; each administered by their own local council, under the basic terms of home rule.

Although the earlier provincial decentralization was rejected by Parliament, President Nasheed reinstated the concept through "National Administrations". The National Administrations of Maldives were in the same divisions as the earlier provinces, and the previous province offices were reinstated as the office of that National Administration, to which the atoll councils reported to accordingly. The National Administrations acted as an extension of the central government in Male’, for the convenience of dealing with regional affairs. The National Administrations operated under the Ministry of Home Affairs. The seven National Administrations were:

• Upper North National Administration
• North National Administration
• North Central National Administration
• Central National Administration
• South Central National Administration
• Upper South National Administration
• South National Administration

North Province was one of the seven short-lived provinces of the Maldives. The provinces were created in a decentralization attempt by the Nasheed administration in 2008. As of 2009, it was governed by the Minister of State for Home Affairs, Ms. Thilmeeza Hussain. Rejecting this change, the Parliament saw the abolition of the province system in 2010, through a newly enacted Decentralization Act. It consisted of Baa, Lhaviyani, Noonu and Raa Atolls. Its capital was Felivaru. Its population (2006 census) was 43,539.

Before Decentralization Act was approved by the Parliament of Maldives, President Mohamed Nasheed appointed Atoll Councilors and Island Councilors to apply the concept of Decentralization to the Administrations of the Councils. As the first Noonu Atoll Councilor Mr. Mohamed Mahid Moosa Fulhu was appointed at the date of 18 August 2009 and remained till 25 December 2010 until the Decentralization Bill was approved by the Parliament of Maldives.

When the Local Government Decentralization Act was established Atoll Councilors and Island Councilors were elected by the vote of the people who belongs to the constituency. Local Council election was elected on 11 February 2011 and Mr. Mohamed Mahid Moosa Fulhu remained the constituency seat for Manadhoo Constituency from February 2011 till February 2014. Mohamed Mahid Moosa Fulhu was elected by the Atoll Council Members as the Vice President of Noonu Atoll Council.

== Geography ==
The whole district consists of 71 islands. 13 of these island are inhabited: Fodhdhoo, Hebadhoo, Holhudhoo, Kedhikolhudhoo, Kudafari, Landhoo, Lhohi, Maafaru, Maalhendhoo, Magoodhoo, Miladhoo and Velidhoo.

The channel to the west of Noonu Atoll is called Baraveli Kandu. "Baraveli" means hermit crab in local Dhivehi language.

Haa Alifu, Haa Dhaalu, Shaviyani, Noonu, Raa, Baa, Kaafu, etc. are code letters assigned to the present administrative divisions of the Maldives. They are not the proper names of the natural atolls that make up these divisions. Some atolls are divided into two administrative divisions while other divisions are made up of two or more natural atolls. The order followed by the code letters is from North to South, beginning with the first letters of the Thaana alphabet used in Dhivehi. These code letters are not accurate from the geographical and cultural point of view. However, they have become popular among tourists and foreigners in the Maldives who find them easier to pronounce than the true atoll names in Dhivehi, (save a few exceptions, like Ari Atoll).

== Ecology ==
Noonu Atoll has the highest density of swarming fishes which can be found in the Maldives, especially Fusiliers and Snappers. It also has a huge spinner dolphin population. The underwater world is also famous for scuba diving. The best known spots are Orimas Thila, a shark point for grey and white tip reef sharks, as well as Christmastree Rock (Vavathi Kurohli Thila) which is famous for the abundant soft coral life.

== Economy ==
Noonu Atoll is home to seven luxury resorts: NOKU Maldives (Kudafunafaru), Soneva Jani (Medhufaru), Cheval Blanc (Randheli), The Sun Siyam (Irufushi), Robinson Club Noonu (Orivaru), Siyam World (Dhigurah) and Velaa Private Island (Fushivelavaru),JOY Maldives (Joy Lagoon Resort, reclaimed lagoon project), Kuredhivaru Resort & Spa
