= Miladhoo =

Island in Miladhummadulhu Atoll, Maldives

Miladhoo މިލަދޫ
- Inhabited island
- Location in Maldives
- Coordinates: 05°47′26″N 73°21′45″E
- Country: Maldives
- Geographic atoll: Miladhummadulhu Atoll
- Administrative atoll: Southern Miladhunmadulu
- Distance to Malé: 179.13 km (111.31 mi)

Dimensions
  - Length: 0.680 km (0.423 mi)
  - Width: 0.350 km (0.217 mi)

Population (2022)
  - Total: 934
- Time zone: UTC+05:00 (MST)

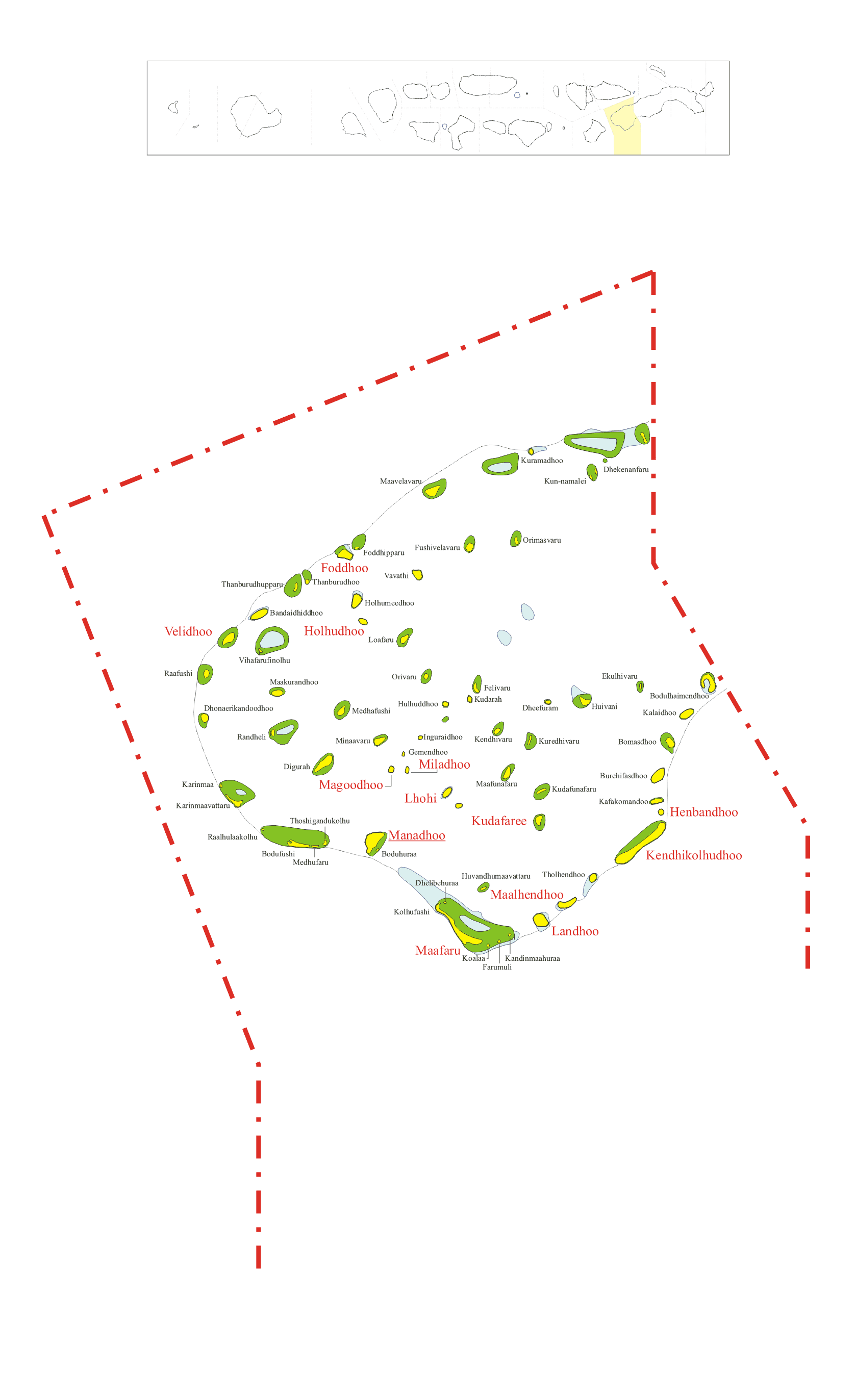
Map of Noonu Atoll

Miladhoo (Dhivehi: މިލަދޫ) is an island in Noonu Atoll in the Maldives.

== Geography ==
The island is 179.13 km (111 mi; 97 nmi) north of the country's capital, Malé.

== Demography ==
Historically, Miladhoo was the most developed and most populous island in Noonu Atoll.

Historical population
Year	Pop.	±%
2006	784	—
2014	799	+1.9%
2022	934	+16.9%
Census populations Source:

== Economy ==
Most economic activity centres around fishing and tourism, followed by rendering taxi service in Male'.

== Education ==
There is a secondary school named Hidhaayaa school. Until the late 1990s, grade 7 was the highest grade taught on the island. Now students are taught up to grade 10 (O level).

== Health ==
There is a health centre with one doctor and a community health worker.

== Sport ==
Miladhoo is best known as the most successful island in football in the atoll. Miladhoo DX Sports Club won the Zone Champions League in 2004.

== Culture ==
Miladhoo is also famous for its Eid festivities.

According to the Periodic report prepared 22 May 1986 and presented to UNESCO by National Council for Linguistic and Historical Research in Miladhoo has two sites.

- A mound called Us-Gandu
- A mound called Redhinge Funi
