= Holhudhoo =

- Inhabited island
- ހޮޅުދޫ
- Location in Maldives
- Coordinates: 05°45′18″N 73°15′47″E
- Country: Maldives
- Geographic atoll: Miladhummadulhu Atoll
- Administrative atoll: Southern Miladhunmadulu
- Distance to Malé: 176.84 km (109.88 mi)

Dimensions
  - Length: 0.630 km (0.391 mi)
  - Width: 0.380 km (0.236 mi)

Population (2022)
  - Total: 1,428
- Time zone: UTC+05:00 (MST)

Holhudhoo (Dhivehi: ހޮޅުދޫ) is one of the inhabited islands of Noonu Atoll. The island is second most populous island in the atoll with 2222. Holhudhoo is also known as 'Bis Holhudhoo'.

== History ==
The island's current population has been pretty recent, with estimated immigration of nearby islanders from 17th to 19th century. But a cemetery was discovered in the middle of the island, which proves that an older population has been living or has lived and abandoned the island before the current inhabitants. Holhudhoo was also the historical capital of Noonu Atoll before being changed due to lack of land.

In the Maldivian history, mention of Holhudhoo has been scarce. One notable case was of Holhudhoo Nevin, whose family played a large part in the Maldives history in 19th and early 20th century.

=== Toponymy ===
The name Holhudhoo means Little island; Holhu, Hulhu means little, and Dhoo means island, as opposed to Meedhoo or maadhoo meaning Large island.

=== Origin of the Name "Bis Holhudhoo" ===
In Dhivehi, the word "Bis" means egg, and Holhudhoo is commonly referred to as "Bis Holhudhoo". One belief is that the island earned this name due to its egg-like shape when viewed from above. However, the most widely accepted explanation comes from an old story passed down by the elders of Holhudhoo. According to this account, in ancient times, Holhudhoo had an abundance of chickens, making eggs a staple food on the island. When a Sultan of the Maldives visited Holhudhoo, the islanders had little to offer apart from their plentiful eggs. As a gift (Vedhun) to the Sultan, they prepared a traditional Malaafaiy, filled with various egg-based dishes, including omelets and other local delicacies. It is said that upon seeing the feast, the Sultan smiled and remarked, "Mee ehkala Bis Holhudhoo dho?" (meaning, "Is this that Egg Holhudhoo?"). This name stuck over time and is still used today. Even in modern times, Holhudhoo continues this tradition by presenting a "Bis Malaafaiy" to Maldivian presidents and dignitaries when they visit the island

== Geography ==
The island is 176.84 km (110 mi; 95 nmi) north of the country's capital, Malé.

== Demography ==
Historical population
Year	Pop.	±%
2006	1,527	—
2014	1,515	−0.8%
2022	1,428	−5.7%
2006-2022: Census populations Source:

Holhudhoo population is a mix of people from all over Maldives. The total population of the island is 2,222.

Resident Population (Census 2022)1,428 (The remaining Population works in resorts and resides in capital Male' for education and jobs)

Male 652 Female 776 Age structure 0-17 460 15-24 157 26-64 503 65+128 Annual Growth Rate- 0.38 Sex Ratio 80.28

== Governance ==
The island is administered by five elected councillors who are elected for a term of five years. The current members were elected from the Maldivian Democratic Party and Progressive Party of Maldives later People's National Congress (Maldives).

Holhudhoo shares a parliamentary district with Miladhoo and Magoodhoo called Holhudhoo Dhaairaa. The current member of parliament is Mohamed Maakin Ahmed Baasith elected as a member of SK Kanmathi (La Familia)

== Economy ==
Holhudhoo's economy has been fishing and agriculture based until the early 1990s. The island current economy is supported by people working in the resorts and construction industry.

In the island jobs are mainly provided by Meynaa School, Island Council, Health center and utilities.

In addition, shops and restaurants also provide jobs.

== Education ==
The island boasts one of the oldest schools in Maldives. Meyna School was found in 1947 by Ibrahim Meynaa Kaleyfaanu. The school currently teaches up to 12th standard. in addition Holhudhoo Pre School provide education for small children. The islands Literacy Rate is 98.73.

== Divisions (Vili) ==
Holhudhoo is divided into 2 main neighbourhoods which are Irumathi Avah (East) and Hulhangu Avah (West). These 2 Avah are subdivided into 6 smaller neighbourhoods also known as vilis.

Avah of Holhudhoo
Avah Name	Direction	Color	Included Vili
Irumathi Avah (SK kanmathi)	East	Green	Iru Uthuru, Iru Medhu, Iru Dhekunu
Hulhangu Avah (RanBokiBoki)	West	Red	Hulhangu Uthuru, Hulhangu Medhu, Hulhangu Dhekunu

Vilis of Holhudhoo
Vili Name	Direction	Color
Iru Uthuru (Shehezaadha)	North East	Red
Iru Medhu (Araakuri)	Mid East	Blue
Iru Dhekunu (Kuriboashi)	South East	Brown
Hulhangu Uthuru (Bandharu)	North West	Pink
Hulhangu Medhu (Goma)	Mid West	Green
Hulhangu Dhekunu (Araathari)	South West	White

== Health ==
Holhudhoo has a health center, which can cater for minor diseases and public health. However for major health problems, the people usually take a boat ride to Manadhoo Atoll Health center, Ugoofaaru Regional Hospital or Male'.
