= Gemendhoo (Dhaalu Atoll) =

- uninhabited island
- Location in Maldives
- Coordinates: 2°47′38″N 73°1′32″E
- Country: Maldives
- Administrative atoll: Dhaalu Atoll
- Distance to Malé: 161.21 km (100.17 mi)

Dimensions
  - Length: 0.300 km (0.186 mi)
  - Width: 0.200 km (0.124 mi)

Population
  - Total: 0
- Time zone: UTC+05:00 (MST)

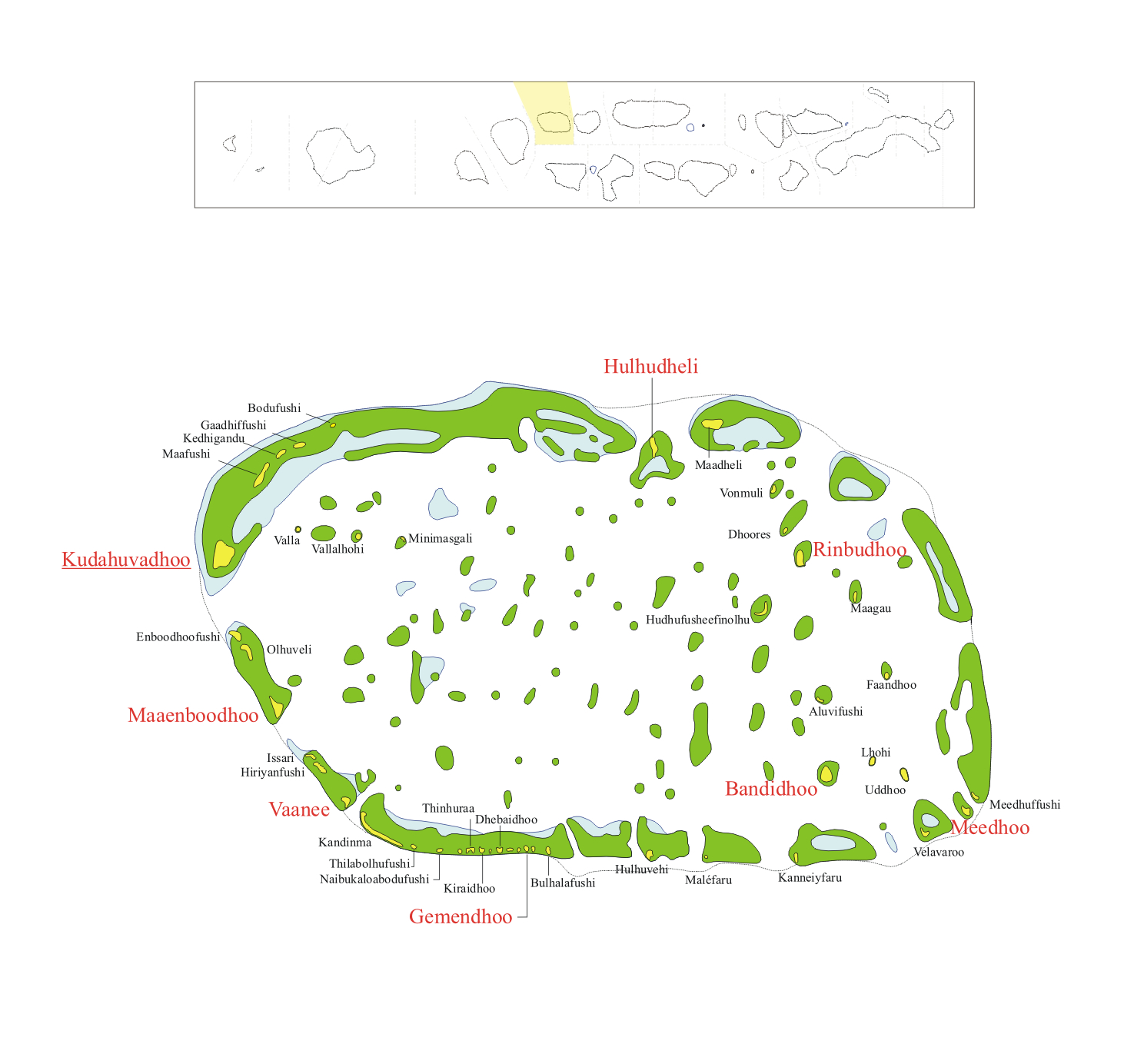
Dhaalu Atoll

Gemendhoo (Dhivehi: ގެމެންދޫ) is a formerly inhabited island of Dhaalu Atoll. The island is located on the eastern fringe of the atoll and is surrounded by a long line of 11 uninhabited islands. The route through these islands from Bulhalafushi (to the north) which ends approximately 7 kilometers away at Naibukaloabodufushi can be walked in low tide. Gemendhoo was completely abandoned after the 2004 Indian Ocean Tsunami. Most of the island's population moved to Kudahuvadhoo, the capital of the atoll.

Prior to the 2004 Indian Ocean Tsunami, Gemendhoo had a population of roughly 500 people. The main economic activity of the island was fishing, however, export of locally made thatch for nearby resort hotels was also a common and profitable activity among locals. The Gemendhoo School taught in English up to grade 7, and for further studies, students went to the Kudahuvadhoo or boys school. Even though the island had a very small community, they were known among the atoll as being very actively involved in the development of the island. They have built a concrete-cement bridge between the uninhibited island called Thanbulhaedhoo, so as to ease the access to their football ground in the middle of island, and also to allow easy collection of coconuts (for food or making coconut oil) and palm leaves (used for thatch making) from the island. This bridge broke from the middle, when the tsunami wave hit. A second structure similar to this bridge was being built as a jetty, before the tsunami, to allow ease of access to the island for fishing boats and small boats (known in Dhivehi as Bokkura), mainly used by the locals to visit near by uninhabited islands. Another example of this can be the main mosque on the island and the home build for expatriate teachers living and working on the island.

Years after the 2004 Indian Ocean Tsunami, the island remains in its ruins, mostly visited for picnics, collection of coconuts, and palm leaves etc. It is not surprising that some of the structures (such as the jetty) still stands on its concrete stilts, faithfully serving its purpose.

A visit to the ruins of Gemendhoo can easily be arranged by contacting locals of Kudahuvadhoo. Since Gemendhoo is surrounded by uninhibited islands, island hopping can be an interesting choice of excursion.
