= Fodhdhoo =

Fodhdhoo ފޮއްދޫ
- Inhabited island
- Location in Maldives
- Coordinates: 05°44′38″N 73°12′58″E
- Country: Maldives
- Geographic atoll: Miladhummadulhu Atoll
- Administrative atoll: Southern Miladhunmadulu
- Distance to Malé: 176.34 km (109.57 mi)

Dimensions
  - Length: 0.780 km (0.485 mi)
  - Width: 0.430 km (0.267 mi)

Population (2022)
  - Total: 345
- Time zone: UTC+05:00 (MST)

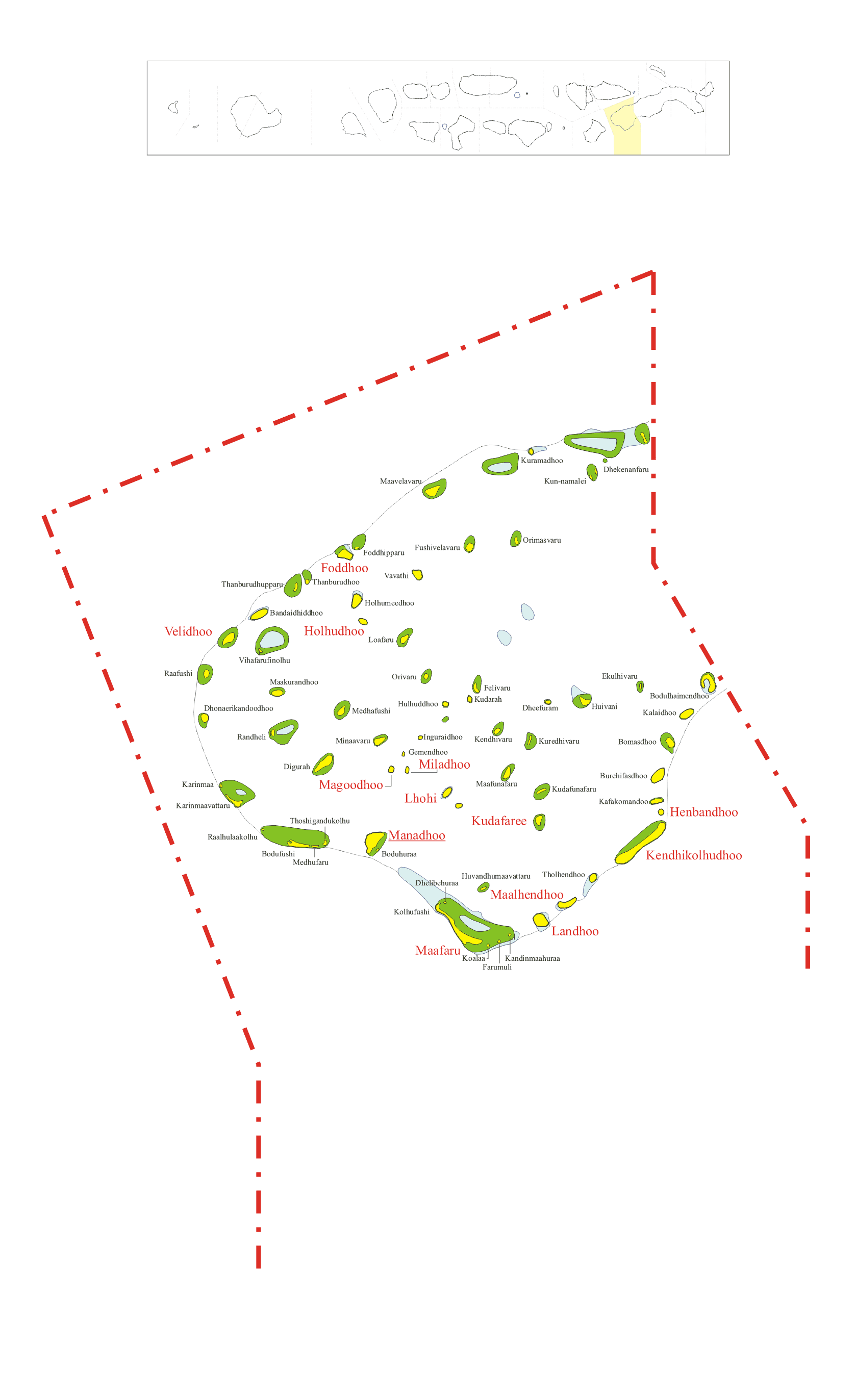
Map of Noonu Atoll Map originally vectored by Hassan Waheed, Aabaadhuge of Thinadhoo island. Note: This section of map was extracted and its text was romanized by Oblivious. Special assitance by Waddey and Zuru

Fodhdhoo (Dhivehi: ފޮއްދޫ) is one of the inhabited islands of Noonu Atoll.

== History ==
=== Toponymy ===
The island is named after the Foggas (Baobab tree), one of the world's kings. Many foreign travelers visited it, and the island's Feili (a cloth worn by Maldivians) was known as Dhera Feili.

== Geography ==
The island is 176.34 km (110 mi; 95 nmi) north of the country's capital, Malé.

== Demography ==
Historical population
Year	Pop.	±%
2006	200	—
2014	215	+7.5%
2022	345	+60.5%
2006-2014-2025: Census populations Source:
