= Magoodhoo (Noonu Atoll) =

Magoodhoo މަގޫދޫ
- Inhabited island
- Location in Maldives
- Coordinates: 05°46′29″N 73°21′39″E
- Country: Maldives
- Geographic atoll: Miladhummadulhu Atoll
- Administrative atoll: Southern Miladhunmadulu
- Distance to Malé: 177.63 km (110.37 mi)

Government
  - Island Chief: Mr. Abdul Ghanee Ali

Dimensions
  - Length: 0.750 km (0.466 mi)
  - Width: 0.530 km (0.329 mi)

Population (2022)
  - Total: 305
- Time zone: UTC+05:00 (MST)

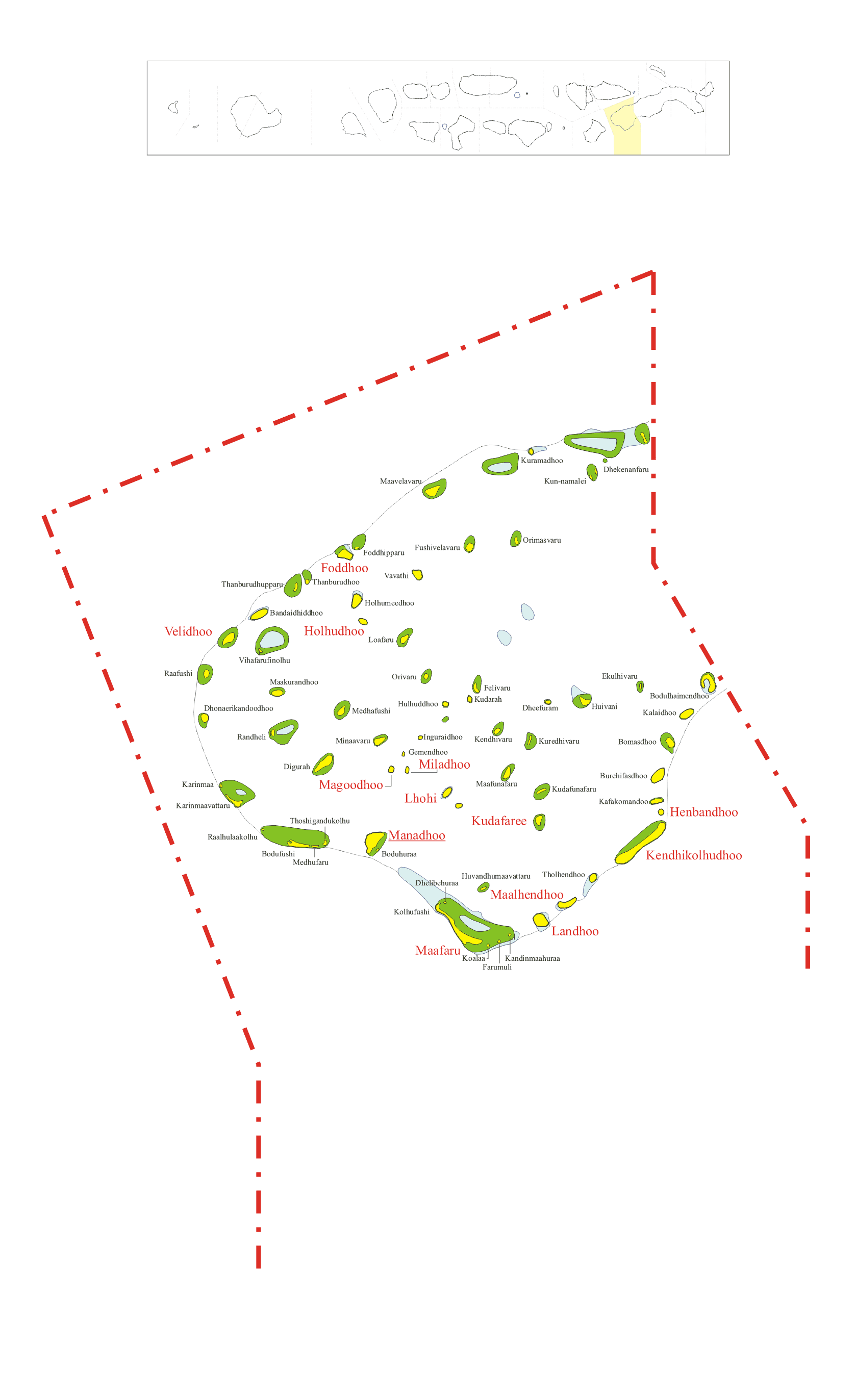
Noonu Atoll

Magoodhoo (Dhivehi: މަގޫދޫ) is one of the inhabited islands of Noonu Atoll.

== Geography ==
The island is 177.63 km (110 mi; 96 nmi) north of the country's capital, Malé.

== Demography ==
Historical population
Year	Pop.	±%
2006	209	—
2014	255	+22.0%
2022	305	+19.6%
2006-2014-2022: Census populations Source:
