= Maafaru (Noonu Atoll) =

Maafaru މާފަރު
- Inhabited island
- Location in Maldives
- Coordinates: 05°49′55″N 73°28′49″E
- Country: Maldives
- Geographic atoll: Miladhummadulhu Atoll
- Administrative atoll: Southern Miladhunmadulu
- Distance to Malé: 183.23 km (113.85 mi)

Government
  - Council: Mohamed Adhnaan

Dimensions
  - Length: 4.630 km (2.877 mi)
  - Width: 0.630 km (0.391 mi)

Population (2022)
  - Total: 919
- Time zone: UTC+05:00 (MST)

Maafaru (Dhivehi: މާފަރު) is one of the inhabited islands of Noonu Atoll in the Maldives.

== Geography ==
The island is 183.23 km (114 mi; 99 nmi) north of the country's capital, Malé.

== Demography ==
Historical population
Year	Pop.	±%
2006	710	—
2014	697	−1.8%
2022	919	+31.9%
2006-2014-2022: Census populations Source:

== Transport ==
Maafaru International Airport was built in 2018, having a 2,200 m (7,200 ft) runway, and built with aid from the Abu Dhabi Fund for Development.

== 9/11 themed Eid celebration ==
The Adha Eid celebrations that took place at Maafaru in 2018 were criticised after photos of it appeared on Facebook. The images show men acting as terrorists armed with pretend rifles and a tower with a US flag on top of it. The finale featured a plastic plane hanging from a wire and crashing into the tower, with smoke and fire billowing. The Facebook post with the images was later removed. The same spectacle has been held on the island for at least two consecutive years, according to the organizer.
