= Dhaalu Atoll =

- Atolls of the Maldives

- Location of Dhaalu in Maldives
- Country: Maldives
- Corresponding geographic atoll(s): Nilandhe Atholhu Dhekunuburi
- Location: 2°50′40″N 72°55′50″E
- Capital: Kudahuvadhoo

Government
  - Atoll Chief: Ahmed Shafiu

Population
  - Total: 5,305
- Letter code: M
- Dhivehi letter code: Dh (ދ)
  - Number of islands: 56
  - Inhabited islands: Bandidhoo * Hulhudheli * Kudahuvadhoo * Maaenboodhoo * Meedhoo * Rinbudhoo
  - Uninhabited islands: Aluvifushi, Ayyakaloahuraa, Boarikifinolhu, Bodufushi, Bulhalafushi, Dhebaidhoo, Dhoores, Enboodhoofushi, Faandhoo, Fenfushi, Gaadhiffushi, Gemendhoo (abandoned), Hinaidhoo, Hiriyanfushi, Hudhufusheefinolhu, Hulhuvehi, Issari, Kandinma, Kanneiyfaru, Kedhigandu, Kiraidhoo, Lhohi, Maadheli, Maafushi, Maagau, Maléfaru, Meedhuffushi, Minimasgali, Naibukaloabodufushi, Olhuveli, Thilabolhufushi, Thinhuraa, Thambalhaidhoo, Uddhoo, Vaanee, Valla, Vallalhohi, Velavaroo, Vonmuli
- Resort islands(*), airports(¤) and industrial islands are also considered uninhabited.

Dhaalu Atoll (also known as Southern Nilandhe Atoll or Dhivehi: ނިލަންދެ އަތޮޅު ދެކުނުބުރި, Nilandhe Atholhu Dhekunuburi) is one of the atolls of the Maldives. It corresponds to the natural atoll of the same name.

== Geography ==
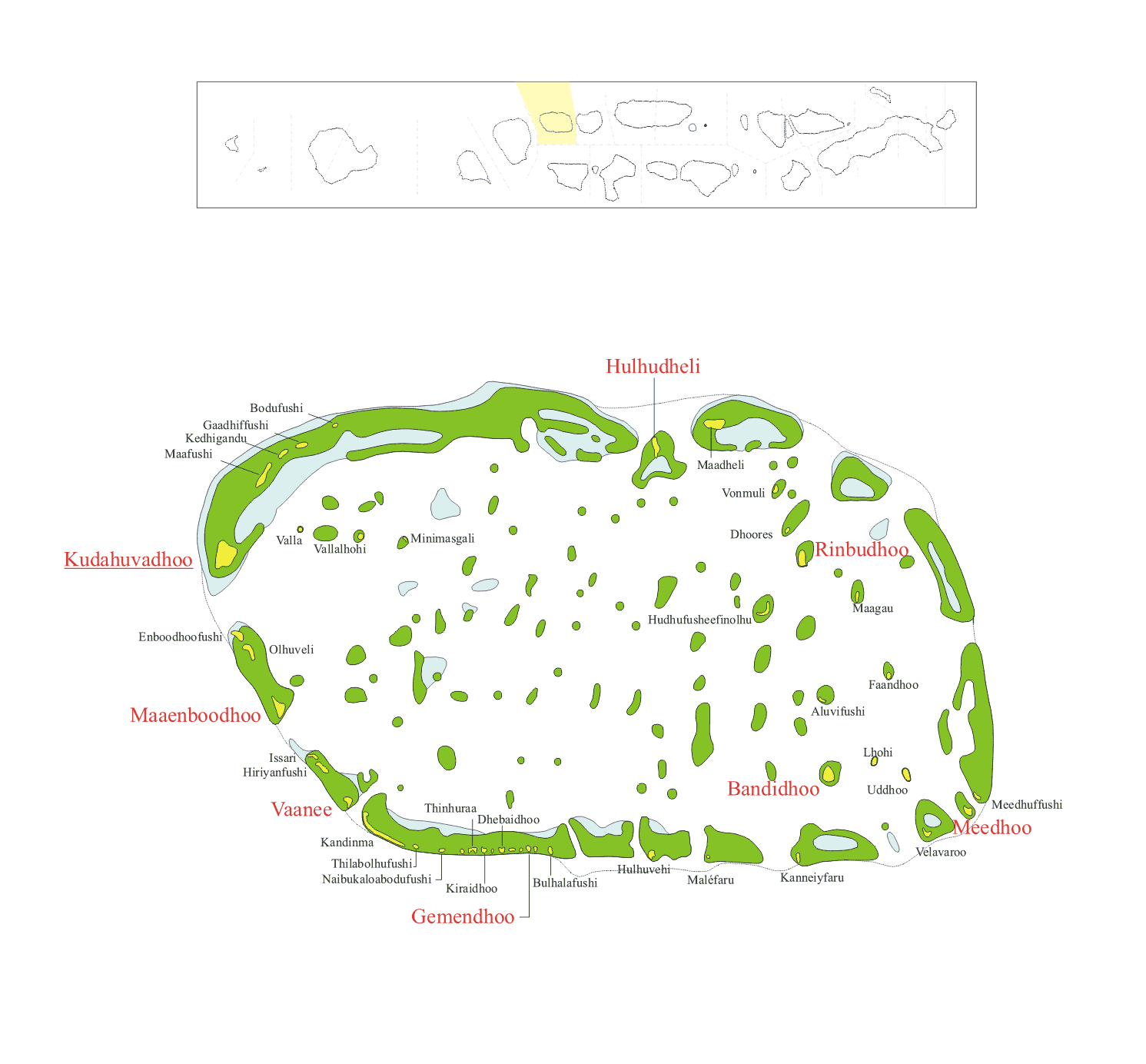
Dhaalu Atoll (north is to the right)

Dhaalu Atoll stretches 23 km (14 mi) from east to west, and 38 km (24 mi) north to south. Out of a total of 56 islands in the atoll, seven of the islands are inhabited, with a total population of around 6694. The capital island is Kudahuvadhoo, located at the atoll's southern tip.

Hulhudheli and Rinbudhoo (Rimbudu) islands, located to the west of the atoll, are islands traditionally renowned for the skill of their jewellers.

The formerly inhabited island of Vaanee on the south-eastern fringe of the atoll was abandoned after the 2004 tsunami and is now used as a police training center.

The formerly inhabited island of Gemendhoo on the eastern fringe of the atoll is surrounded by a long line of 11 uninhabited islands. The route from Bulhalafushi to Naibukaloabodufushi passes through these islands and can be walked in during low tide.

The islands of Kandin'ma, Thilabolhufushi, Thinhuraa/Kiraidhoo, and Kiraidhoo/Fenmeeruhuraa on Gemendhoo reef are reported to have mangroves. Additionally, The inhabited island of Maaenboodhoo also has a mangrove.

Dhaalu Atoll Hospital is located in the island of Kudahuvadhoo.

Dhaalu Atoll is accessible through regular domestic flights from Velana International Airport to Dhaalu Airport located on Kudahuvadhoo as well as local ferry services.

== History ==
Traders and children waiting at the harbour of Rinbudhoo

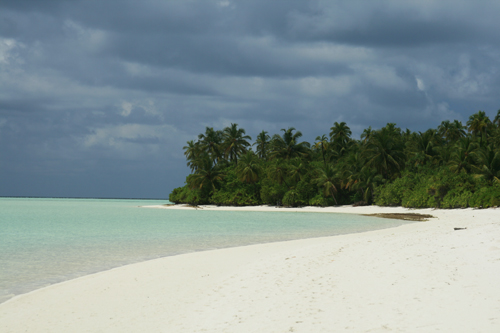
The uninhabited island of Maafushi in Dhaalu Atoll

Some of the islands in this atoll have remains from the Buddhist period, but none of them have been properly excavated yet. Mysterious mounds known as hawittas are as well as a copperplate found in Kudahuvadhu. The old mosque of Kudahuvadhoo possesses some of the finest masonry in the country.

The once inhabited island of Maadheli contains many ruins of temples from the Buddhist Era as well as a mosque. It seems that the island was abandoned in the 19th century.

Opened to tourism in 1998, the atoll has become a popular location for scuba diving.

Gemendhoo was abandoned after the Boxing Day tsunamis destroyed the buildings.

Rinbudhoo was also badly hit by the tsunami and half of the population were migrated to thulusdhoo. It is said Rinbudhoo was one of the islands having the highest density of population back in the early days. but now its just the opposite. The Island has an almost 300 years old masjid built with curved stones.

== Tourism ==
Dhaalu Atoll is home to several luxury tourist resorts including St Regis Vommuli Maldives, Niyama Private Islands Maldives, Kandima Maldives, Angsana Velavaru, Vilu Reef, and Aaaveee. Several other resorts are under development.

One of the most prominent lifestyle resorts in the atoll is Kandima Maldives, known for its wide range of activities and modern design. Opened in 2017, the resort spans nearly 3 kilometres and offers 270 rooms, making it one of the largest in the Maldives. The resort recently expanded its leisure facilities with the launch of Fast Track on 15 November 2024, which serves as the Maldives' first professional-grade asphalt e-go-kart circuit, featuring a 500-metre oceanfront track with 12 turns and speeds reaching 80 km/h. This was followed by the opening of PlaySpace in 2025, an indoor entertainment hub that includes the island's first boutique bowling alley, private karaoke suites, escape rooms, and a dedicated zone for virtual reality (VR) and classic arcade gaming. These additions further establish the resort's positioning as a hub for active lifestyle and multi-generational entertainment in the region.

== Healthcare ==
Dhaalu Atoll Hospital is the regional hospital in the atoll, being located in the atoll's capital, Kudahuvadhoo. The hospital offers general medicine and specialized services along with paediatrics, anesthesiology, surgery and gynecology, along with the inauguration of dental services by former president, Ibrahim Mohamed Solih.
