= Manadhoo =

Manadhoo މަނަދޫ
- Inhabited island
- Location in Maldives
- Coordinates: 05°45′46″N 73°24′38″E
- Country: Maldives
- Geographic atoll: Miladhummadulhu Atoll
- Administrative atoll: Southern Miladhunmadulu
- Distance to Malé: 175.89 km (109.29 mi)

Government
  - Council President: Ali Zafir

Dimensions
  - Length: 1.650 km (1.025 mi)
  - Width: 0.950 km (0.590 mi)

Population (2026)
  - Total: 2,180
- Time zone: UTC+05:00 (MST)

Manadhoo (Dhivehi: މަނަދޫ) is the capital of Noonu Atoll in the Maldives. Manadhoo is the third most populous island and the largest natural island in Noonu Atoll.

== History ==
So far, the history of Manadhoo has not been studied by any authority despite having a historic place known as "Maamiskithu Vevu" a bathing tank with ancient Arabic calligraphy and well-bricked walls. Vevu (Dhivehi) or bathing tanks, were used as public baths and later for ablution. The actual period of this Vevu is unknown, however sandstone used in construction is evidence pointing to the pre-Islamic period (500BCE-1153AD).These types of baths are found in other parts of Maldives. Coral stone is also seen in some of the baths and mosques. This supports the theory that the Vevu was built earlier than most coral stone mosques.

Little information is available on the ancient people and their way of life. Evidence suggests that Manadhoo has been populated and thriving as early as the 4th-century BC. It is argued that the earliest settlers migrated from Arabia, eastern Africa and the Indian subcontinent among other places.

== Manadhoo Boi Valhu (Well Built By A Greek Prince Royal Sailors) ==
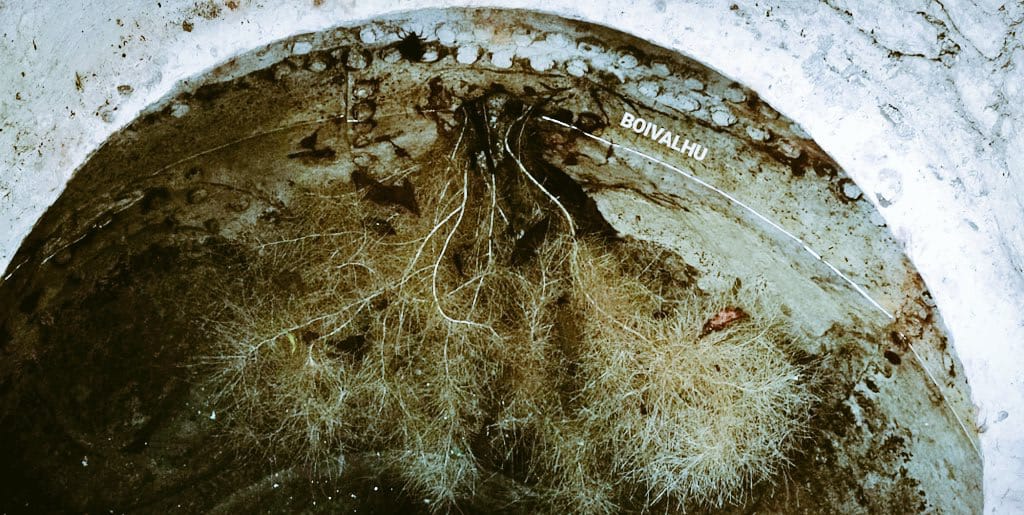
Manadhoo Boi Valhu

N. Manadhoo Boi Valhu Video - Credits To: Manadhoo Nevi Shafeeu

Long ago, a Greek princess and her husband were sailing far from home when their ship ran out of drinking water. Then they saw Manadhoo — an island with banyan trees and coconut palms. They anchored on the northern side. The princess ordered her slaves to dig a well near the beach. They cleared a jungle patch, built a private open-air enclosure with woven coconut-leaf walls and Dhiggaa pillars, and carved four steps inside the well so the royal couple could descend for a shower. By evening the well was ready. A simple dhaani — coconut shell tied to a Dhiggaa stick — let them draw the fresh water. Married six years without a child, they had sex that night in their private sanctuary on a woven coconut mat. As the princess rested her head on her husband’s thighs, a Dhonmadhu fruit fell from a nearby Midhili tree and struck her stomach. Its bright greenish-yellow, juicy beauty amazed them — they had never seen such a fruit. They decided to take it to the ship’s elders. They drank, showered again, and walked west to Kashimas Thundi at sunset, passing through bokeyo, kashikeyo, magoo, unimaa, thamburu veyo, and Midhili trees. Islanders in the northeast corner saw the ship and feared pirates, so no one dared approach. The couple’s week of love remained secret. They stayed one full week, returning daily to Boivalhu. Then they sailed home to Greece. Soon the princess showed signs of pregnancy. Nine months later she gave birth to a baby girl whose glowing skin reminded them of the Dhonmadhu that had fallen as an omen. Almost two years later they returned to Manadhoo with their daughter. They bathed her in the well as thanks. They brought an iron “boi” — a buoy-like dome made of bent iron panels with holes along the edges, bolted together with rivets. Workers deepened the center, installed the 5-foot-wide open-top boi as base to hold back loose sand, built a round stone-and-cement wall on top, plastered it on both sides, and added a six-inch rim for strength. In the evening they walked to the village, shared their full story — the thirst, the well, the falling fruit, the miracle baby — and gave gifts. The islanders welcomed them, and they became friends. The royal couple declared Boivalhu a symbol of their love and a community drinking well for everyone — about 5–6 feet wide, the largest and most reliable on the island. For a number of years women walked the Goalhi from Sosun Magu to the north harbour carrying bandiyaa — some balancing one on the head, others stacking two, or carrying one on the hip and one on the head. Later, in the Atoll Chief era, a chief posted to Manadhoo lived in the Atholhuge with his wife. After six childless years and failed modern medicine, they drank Boivalhu’s water — and soon she was pregnant. But in the 1990s, when the Atholhuge was expanded to become the Noonu Atoll Council premises, nearby houses were bought and the boundary moved eastward. Boivalhu ended up in the middle of the council compound. To make way for development, it was covered and buried beneath the ground. The younger generation grew up never seeing the well or the path their parents took to fetch water. Then, on 27 October 2019, council workers digging for a freshwater fish pond struck something. They uncovered Boivalhu again — still intact after decades underground. Inside they found the iron boi: panels joined by riveted bolts, strong enough to survive. And so the legend of Boivalhu lives on: a well born from thirst, shaped by royal love, blessed by a falling fruit, carried by our mothers and grandmothers, buried by progress, and brought back to light by chance on 27 October 2019. People still say: if you stand where Boivalhu once flowed and speak your hope with true heart... miracles may still answer.

== Geography ==
The island is 175.89 km (109 mi; 95 nmi) north of the country's capital, Malé.

Geographically, Manadhoo is situated in the very centre of the atoll equally reachable for rest of other inhabited island to the north and south-west of the atoll. The island of Manadhoo measures approximately 02.36 hectares (6 acres), and has a natural harbour surrounded by natural seawalls. The island is at the south-east of the atoll, according to the formation of the atoll. The major available land is uninhabited.

== Governance ==
The island is the capital of South Miladhunmadulu (Noonu Atoll), and most of the government offices have been established.

- The Secretariat of the South Miladhummadulu Atoll Council
- Manadhoo Police Station
- Secretariat of the Manadhoo Council
- Noonu Manadhoo Magistrate court
- Noonu Atoll School
- Noonu Atoll Hospital
- Noonu Atoll Family and Children Service Centre
- Maldives Inland Revenue Authority (MIRA) - Manadhoo Branch
- Prosecutor General's Office - Miladhunmadulu Dhekunuburi Branch
- FENAKA Corporation - Manadhoo Branch
- Maldives Post - Noonu Manadhoo Branch
- Bank of Maldives - Manadhoo Branch
- Agro National Corporation - N Atoll Branch
- Business Centre Corporation - N Atoll Branch

The President of Manadhoo council is Mr. Abdurrahman Sobeeh.

== Demography ==
Manaduans are a mixed race, as in any part of the Maldives.

Historical population
Year	Pop.	±%
2006	1,201	—
2014	1,871	+55.8%
2022	1,745	−6.7%
2006-2014-2022: Census populations Source:

== Economy ==
The main livelihood of the population depends on construction carpentry work civil service, tourism, fishing and private business.

The island has become a hub for the atoll ferry service, and wholesale business. Hence, respective citizens from other islands travel for medical and banking service, while retailers acquire their day-to-day supplies at the same rates as in the capital city.

Most of the basic infrastructure was built through aid granted from overseas organizations, such as the recent upgrade to the harbour which was funded by French aid. The sewerage and sanitation systems were built through aid granted from the UN. Manadhoo has the atoll school, which was built with grant aid from Japanese government during the 1980s.

Manadhoo is in close proximity to luxury hotels, which have been built recently, such as Soneva Jani and Cheval Blanc Randheli (operated by Louis Vuitton and Moët Hennessy), now owned by Sheik Mansour from Abu Dhabi.

The economy of Manadhoo is unhealthy like other islands of Maldives, hence no large-scale economic activities take place. Most of the citizens were engaged in public sector employment, with the rest employed in the tourism sector.

There has been a plan to develop tourist guest houses on the island, knowing that Maafaru Airport would begin operation in 2018 (funded by investment from the UAE). This could be a vital turning point for Manadhoo, hence the island is capable of leasing large amount of land to the beach front facing towards sunset.

=== Other services ===
Atoll Development Council Guest House, Bank of Maldives Manadhoo Branch, Noonu Atoll Family and Children Service Center and Noonu Manadhoo Post contributes to the infrastructure of the island.

== Transportation ==
There are several Passenger and Cargo, Boats/Speed Boats operating between Manadhoo and the capital Male'; it takes about nine hours on the sea in order to reach the destination. However it only takes about 3 hours from Manadhoo to Male' by Speed Boats. Also there is the option of Air Transport, from Maafaru International Airport. Maafaru is just 5 minutes away from Manadhoo, if by Speed Boats.

=== Boats ===
- Manzil Boat (Noonu Miladhoo)
- Nala boat ( Noonu kendhikulhudhoo)
- Maafaru Boat (Noonu Maafaru)

=== Speed Boats and Ferry Services ===
- Hope Travels HITHA
- Hope Travels DHOSHA
- Anax Express
- Apple Express
- Ell Prince
- Ell Queen
- Ell Speed
- Ell Speed 3
- Nizaam 2

== Education ==
Noonu Atoll School is located on the island. Traditionally, education in the Manadhoo was limited to the basic literacy skills; namely the recital of the Quran, reading and writing the Dhivehi language. The modern system of English medium education was introduced in 1997.

== Health ==
Noonu Atoll Hospital, the STO Pharmacy and Maldivian Redcrescent Noonu Branch Office.

The island has severely poor achievements in human population.

== Culture ==
=== Language ===
Dhivehi is the language spoken in Manadhoo. Spoken only in Maldives, Dhivehi belongs to the Indo-Aryan branch of the Indo-European family of languages. It has numerous loanwords from Tamil, Malayalam, Sinhalese, Arabic, Urdu, Hindi, Portuguese and English.

=== Religion ===
Islam is the official religion of the Republic of Maldives.

== Non-profit Organizations and Sports Teams of Manadhoo ==
Like all other communities, Manadhoo also has Ngo's that works for the betterment of Manadhoo. Currently there are only 7 Ngo's actively working in Manadhoo.

=== NGO ===
- Manadhoo Ekuveri Club (MEC)
- Manadhoo Vilares Club (MVC)
- Manadhoo Zuvaanunge Gulhun (MZG)
- SMART Society (SMART)
- Society for Manadhoo Youth Linkage (SMYL)
- Society for Youth Recreating Union of Patriots (SYRUP)
- Chester Sports (Chester)

=== Sports Teams ===
- Baburu Sports Club
- Kanmathi Juniors
- Damcaster United
- Butani FC
- JT SPORTS CLUB
- Furious FC
- FC Cicada
- Prides FT
- Wasted FC
- Crowns FT
- Kanmathi jr
- furious jr
- chester united
