= Kudahuvadhoo =

Inhabited island in Dhaalu Atoll, Maldives

Kudahuvadhoo ކުޑަހުވަދޫ
- Inhabited island
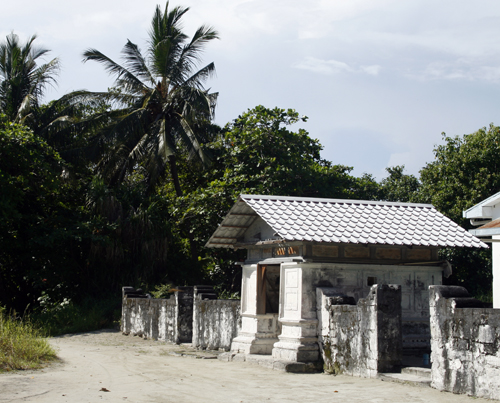
- The old mosque of Kudahuvadhoo famous for its fine masonry

- Location in Maldives
- Coordinates: 2°40′15.96″N 72°53′36.42″E
- Country: Maldives
- Geographic atoll: Indian Ocean (2°40' North; 72°54' East)
- Administrative atoll: Dhaalu Atoll
- Distance to Malé: 179.70 km (111.66 mi)

Dimensions
  - Length: 1.150 km (0.715 mi)
  - Width: 0.875 km (0.544 mi)

Population (2022)
  - Total: 3,132 (including foreigners)
- Time zone: UTC+05:00 (MST)

Kudahuvadhoo (Dhivehi: ކުޑަހުވަދޫ) is one of the inhabited islands of Dhaalu Atoll in the Maldives. It is also the capital of Dhaalu Atoll.

== History ==
=== Buddhist Period ===
The Buddhist era on the island of Kudahuvadhoo lasted from around 400 AD to 1258 AD, with sailors and Aryan immigrants bringing the religion from Sri Lanka and Southern India. Other citizens on the island and island chain were also known to have practiced paganism. Many Hindus also resided on the island as the religion was brought with the Aryans from modern-day Pakistan and western India.

==== Hawittas ====
Kudahuvadhoo has one of the mysterious mounds known as hawittas. These mounds are the ruins of Buddhist temples from the pre-Islamic period (before the 10th century) that have not been excavated yet. Thor Heyerdahl, who explored the island in the early 1980s, wrote that the ancient coral-stone mosque of Kudahuvadhoo possesses some of the finest masonry ever seen in the world. The unique masonry surpasses that of the famous Inca wall in Cuzco, Peru.

=== Islam In Kudahuvadhoo ===
Kudahuvadhoo Loamaafaanu (official copper plates with inscriptions), provides that king Al-Sultan Valla Dio Kalaminjaa Siri Raa-Araa Desvaru Mahaa Radun (Dhivehi: އައްސުލްޠާން ވައްލާ ދިއޯ ކަލަމިންޖާ ސިރީ ރާއަރާދޭސްވަރު މަހާރަދުން), who ruled the Maldives from 1233 AD to 1258 AD was responsible for spreading Islam to the island. The inscription provides that the citizens of Kudahuvadhoo became Muslim 88 years after the country officially adopted Islam.

== Geography ==
The island is 179.84 km (112 mi; 97 nmi) south of the country's capital, Malé. It is the capital of the atoll. Kudahuvadhoo is the largest island in Dhaalu Atoll, the other islands in Dhaalu Atoll are quite small.

=== Climate ===
Kudahuvadhoo has a tropical rainforest climate (Köppen: Af).

Climate data for Kudahuvadhoo
Month	Jan	Feb	Mar	Apr	May	Jun	Jul	Aug	Sep	Oct	Nov	Dec	Year
Mean daily maximum °C (°F)	27.5 (81.5)	27.8 (82.0)	28.4 (83.1)	28.7 (83.7)	28.6 (83.5)	28.5 (83.3)	28.2 (82.8)	28.1 (82.6)	28.0 (82.4)	27.8 (82.0)	27.6 (81.7)	27.6 (81.7)	28.1 (82.5)
Daily mean °C (°F)	27.0 (80.6)	27.3 (81.1)	27.7 (81.9)	28.0 (82.4)	27.9 (82.2)	27.9 (82.2)	27.5 (81.5)	27.4 (81.3)	27.3 (81.1)	27.1 (80.8)	26.9 (80.4)	26.9 (80.4)	27.4 (81.3)
Mean daily minimum °C (°F)	26.3 (79.3)	26.6 (79.9)	27.0 (80.6)	27.1 (80.8)	26.9 (80.4)	27.0 (80.6)	26.6 (79.9)	26.6 (79.9)	26.4 (79.5)	26.2 (79.2)	26.0 (78.8)	26.1 (79.0)	26.6 (79.8)
Average precipitation mm (inches)	89.4 (3.52)	65.0 (2.56)	76.8 (3.02)	125.0 (4.92)	213.8 (8.42)	100.6 (3.96)	128.3 (5.05)	150.9 (5.94)	182.1 (7.17)	216.7 (8.53)	263.4 (10.37)	194.3 (7.65)	1,806.3 (71.11)
Source: Weather.Directory

== Demography ==
Historical population
Year	Pop.	±%
2006	1,639	—
2014	2,216	+35.2%
2022	3,132	+41.3%
2006-2014-2022: Census populations Source:

According to the 2022 Census, conducted in September 2022, Kudahuvadhoo had a resident population of 3,132 (this number includes the residents of Gemendhoo and Vaanee evacuated to Kudahuvadhoo after the Boxing Day Tsunami of 2004).

== Economy ==
People from other islands come to Kudahuvadhoo for better education and health facilities. Moreover, Kudahuvadhoo is the urban hub in the whole central area of the Maldives, which includes Faafu Atoll, Meemu Atoll and Dhaalu Atoll.

== Transport ==
Kudahuvadhoo is a fast developing island in the Maldives. Dhaalu Airport, the regional airport for Dhaalu Atoll, is located on Kudahuvadhoo and opened to the public on July 1, 2017. The airport has a 1800m long runway making it one of the largest domestic airports in the Maldives.
