= Trans Maldivian Airways =

Airline of the Maldives

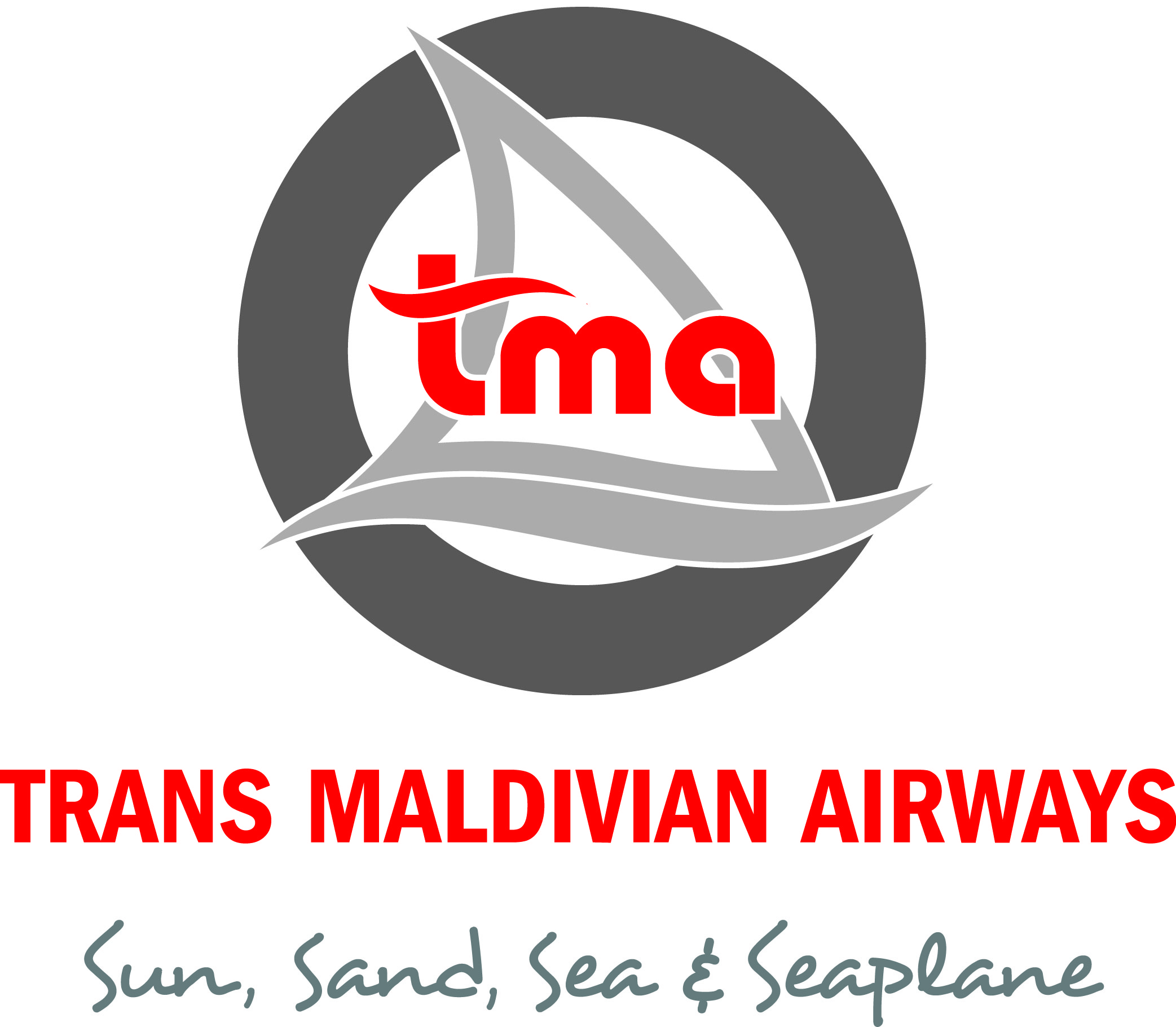
IATA	ICAO	Call sign
-	TMW	TRANS MALDIVIAN
- Founded: 1989; 37 years ago (as Hummingbird Island Helicopters)
- Hubs: Velana International Airport; Gan International Airport
- Fleet size: 65
- Destinations: 79
- Parent company: Carlyle
- Headquarters: Velana International Airport; Malé, Maldives
- Key people: A. U. M. Fawzy (CEO)
- Website: http://www.transmaldivian.com/

Trans Maldivian Airways (Pvt) Ltd. (TMA) is a private airline headquartered on the grounds of Velana International Airport in Malé, Maldives.

Operating out of Velana International Airport, TMA is the oldest air transfer operator operating in the country, providing seaplane transfer services to a large number of tourist resorts. TMA in 2013 operated the world's largest seaplane fleet. As of 2016, December it operates out of Gan International Airport, servicing resorts in Addu, and Huvadhu Atoll.

== History ==
=== Hummingbird Island Airways ===
The airline was founded in 1989 as Hummingbird Island Helicopters by pilot Kit Chambers. The company operated a strictly helicopter fleet of aircraft, moving tourists from the airport to a select number of island resorts. 1993 saw the establishment of Maldivian Air Taxi, a direct competitor offering more-preferred seaplane transfers. In order to revive the market, the company was rebranded as Hummingbird Island Airways in 1997, introducing Twin Otter seaplanes to its fleet. By 1999, the fleet had transitioned out all helicopters and had a seaplane-only lineup.

=== Trans Maldivian Airways ===
In the year 2000, Hummingbird Island was rebranded as Trans Maldivian Airways, under new management. In the next years, TMA acquired a fleet of 16 Twin Otter seaplanes, operating alongside Maldivian Air Taxi to provide transfer services to a growing number of tourist resorts in numerous atolls of the archipelago.

In 2006, TMA announced intentions to acquire 3 ATR 42 aircraft to begin operations to the domestic airports scattered in the atolls. One of the ATR aircraft were brought to Male' in early 2007, and operations began to Gan in August. In 2009, TMA announced that they were suspending all domestic operations due to losses, and the two ATR aircraft acquired were subsequently sold.

2011 saw the first Twin Otter Series 400 aircraft brought to the TMA fleet, bringing the total fleet to 23.

=== Merger with Maldivian Air Taxi ===
Maldivian Air Taxi, established in 1993, was the sole competitor of TMA in the seaplane transfer industry. The company boasted the world's largest seaplane fleet. On February 4, 2013, the American equity fund Blackstone Group announced their buyout of the majority stake of both Trans Maldivian Airways and Maldivian Air Taxi, to form a new company with a combined fleet of 44 seaplanes, making it the largest seaplane fleet in the world by far. The new company would retain the Trans Maldivian Airways brand name, with a new logo and livery integrating the colours of Maldivian Air Taxi.

The new merger company, with conjunction with the Maldives Transport Authority, has proposed to launch seaplane services to inhabited islands in the atolls, in addition to the currently served resort islands.

=== Sold to Bain Capital ===
On December 18, 2017 – Bain Capital Private Equity announced that it has formed a consortium to acquire Trans Maldivian Airways ("TMA"), the world’s largest seaplane operator headquartered in the Maldives, from Blackstone Group. The Bain Capital-led consortium includes Shenzhen Tempus Global Business Services Holdings Ltd ("Tempus Global") (300178) and TBRJ Fund 1 L.P. Bain Capital, which is headquartered in the US, will own approximately 80% of TMA.

== Destinations ==
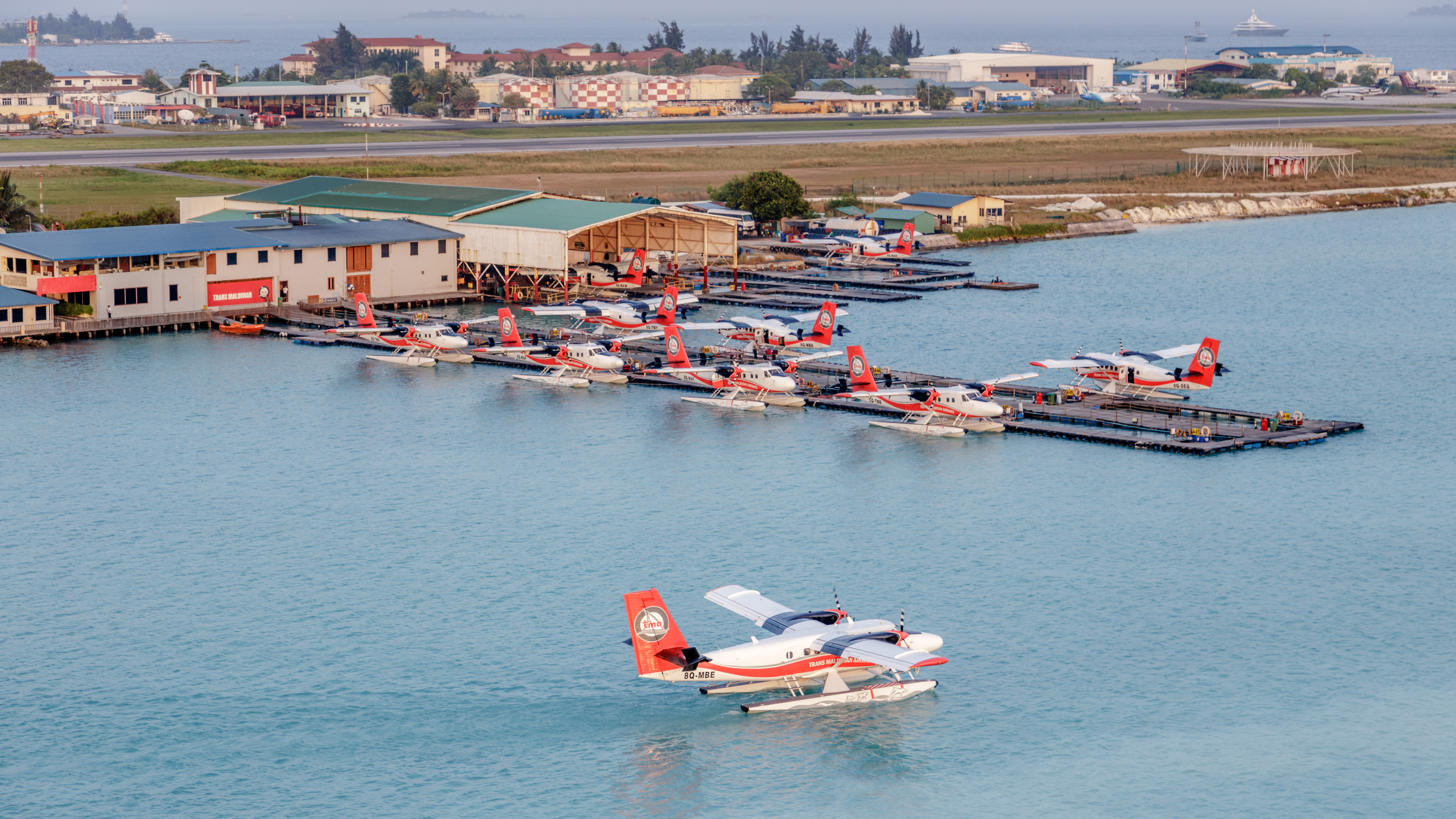
TMA Terminal

The Maldives are one of the most attractive destinations for tourists and it has many resorts to cater to them. TMA has seaplane transfer services for tourists to and from the following resort islands:

Haa Alif Atoll

- Manafaru (JA Manafaru)
- Dhonakulhi (Hideaway Beach Resort and Spa)

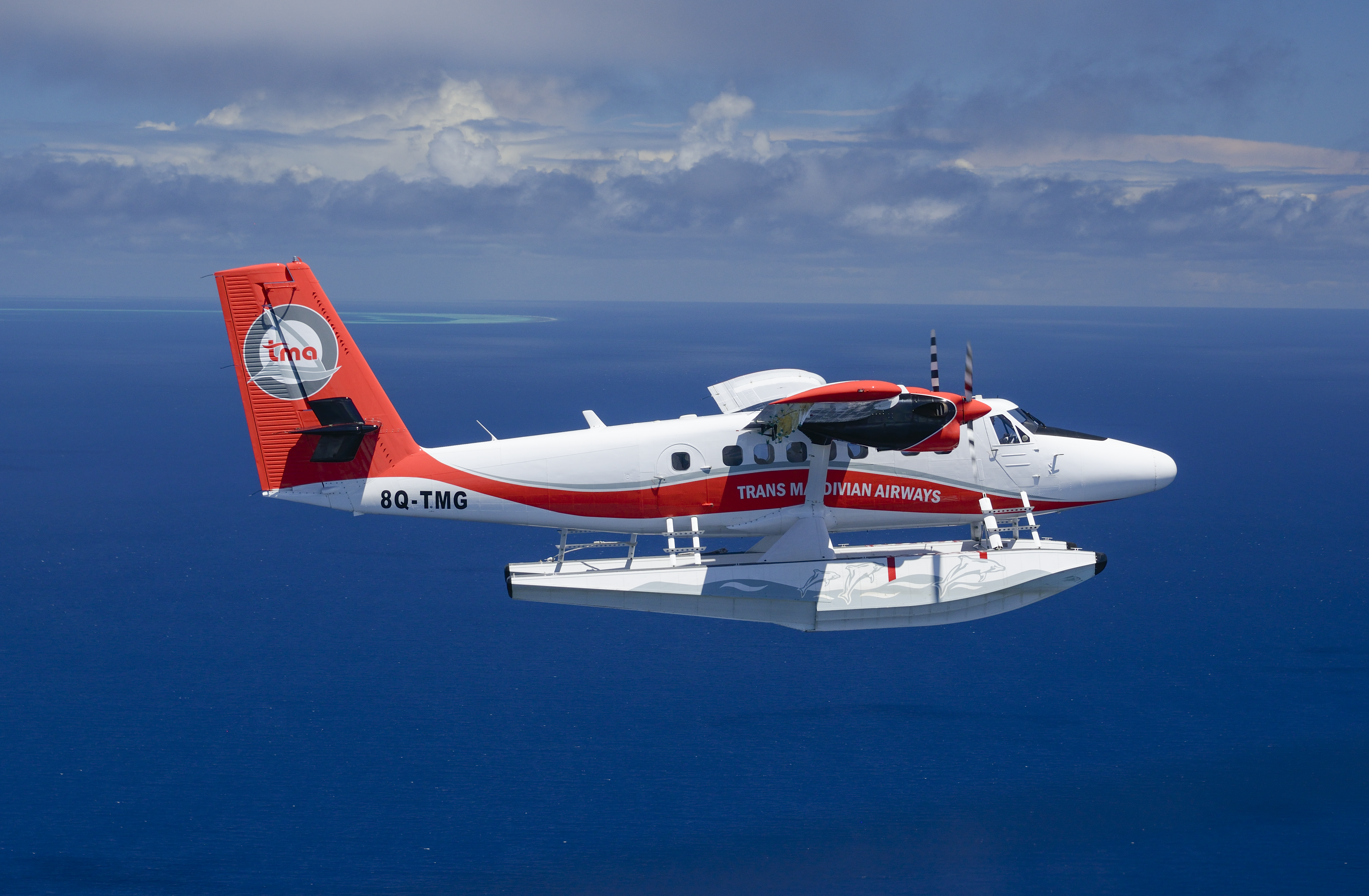
Trans Maldivian Airways Aircraft Livery

Shaviyani Atoll

- Gaakoshinbi (Fairmont Sirru Fen Fushi)
- Vagaru (JW Marriott Maldives Resort & Spa)

Noonu Atoll

- Fushivelaavaru (Velaa Private Island)
- Medhafushi (Sun Siyam Iru Fushi Maldives)
- Dhigurah (Siyam World Maldives)
- Kudafunafaru (Noku Maldives)
- Medhufaru (Soneva Jani)
- Kuredhivaru (Mövenpick Resort Kuredhivaru)
- Randheli (Cheval Blanc Randheli)
- Velidhoo (Charter)

Raa Atoll

- Aarah (Heritance Aarah)
- Dhigali (Dhigali Maldives)
- Faarafushi (Faarufushi Maldives)
- Filaidhoo (Reethi Faru Maldives)
- Furaveri (Furaveri Island Resort)
- Huruvalhi (The Standard Huruvalhi Maldives)
- Meedhupparu (Adaaran Select Medhupparu)
- Uthurumaafaru (You & Me by Cocoon Maldives)

Baa Atoll

- Dhunikolhu (Coco Palm Dhuni Kolhu)
- Dhigufaruvinagandu (Dhigufaru Island Resort)
- Finolhas (Amilla Fushi)
- Fonimagoodhoo (Reethi Beach Resort)
- Kanifushi (Finolhu)
- Kunfunadhoo (Soneva Fushi)
- Landaa Giraavaru (Four Seasons Resort Maldives at Landaa Giraavaru)
- Milaidhoo (Milaidhoo)
- Miriandhoo (The Westin Maldives Miriandhoo)
- Mudhdhoo (Dusit Thani Maldives)
- Thiladhoo (The Nautilus Maldives)

Lhaviyani Atoll

- Thilamaafushi (Le Méridien Maldives Resort & Spa)
- Fushifaru (Fushifaru Maldives)
- Huruvalhi (Hurawalhi Maldives Resort)
- Innahura (Innahura Maldives Resort)
- Kanifushi (Atmosphere Kanifushi)
- Kanuhura (Kanuhura)
- Komandoo (Komandoo Maldives Island Resort)
- Kudadhoo (Kudadhoo Maldives Private Island)
- Kuredhdhoo (Kuredu Resort)
- Madhiriguraidhoo (Palm Beach Resort and Spa Maldives)
- Ookolhufinolhu (Cocoon Maldives)

Kaafu Atoll

- Biyadhoo (Biyadhoo Island Resort)
- Bolifushi (Jumeirah Vittaveli)
- Helengeli (Helengeli Island Resort)
- Kuda Huraa (Four Seasons Resort Maldives at Kuda Huraa)
- Medhufinolhu (One & Only Reethi Rah)
- Meerufenfushi (Meeru Island Resort and Spa)
- Olhahali (LUX* North Male' Atoll)
- Ziyaaraifushi (Summer Island Village)

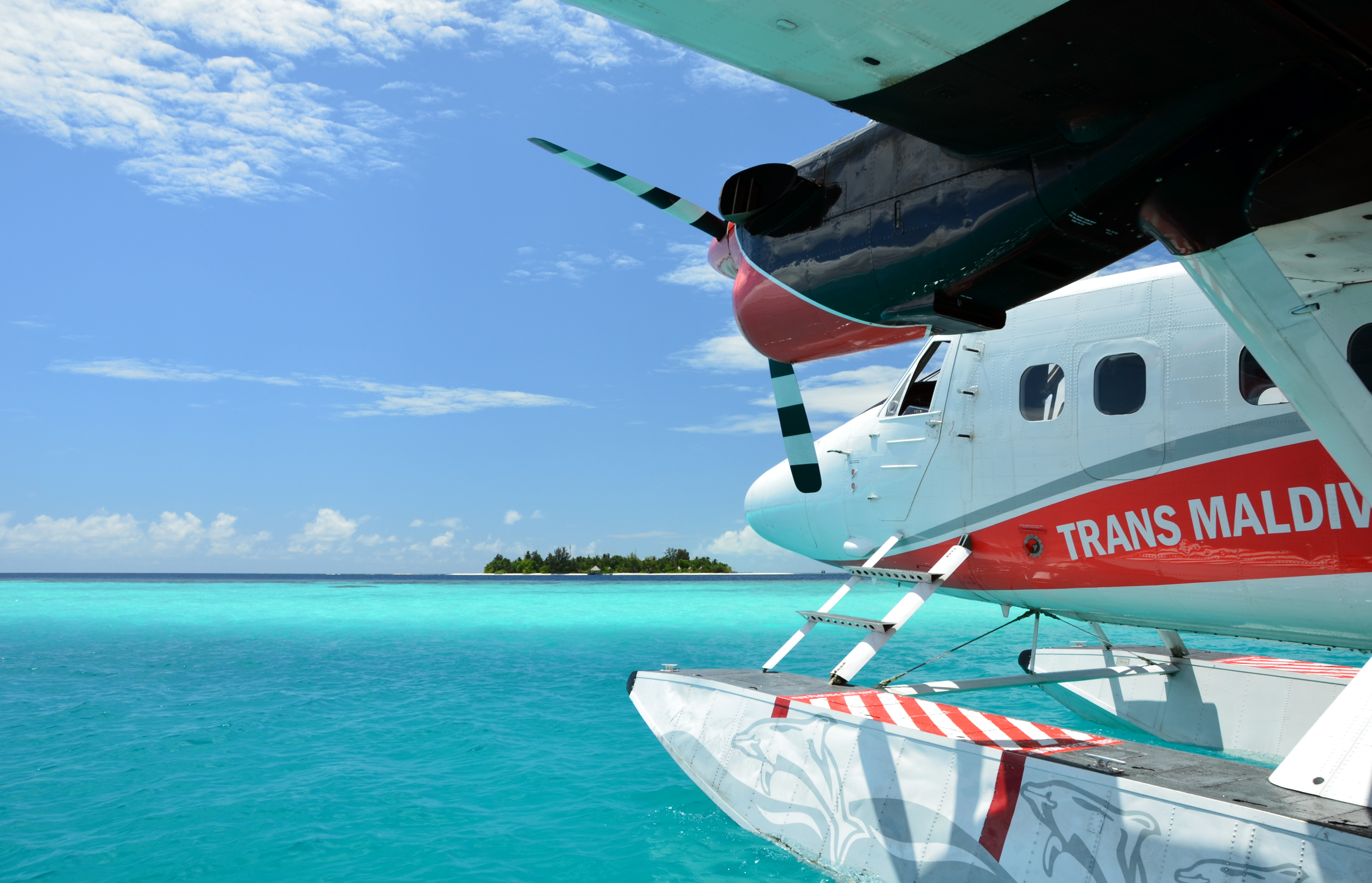
TMA floatplane to the north of Bathala island

Alif Alif Atoll

- Ellaidhoo (Chaaya Reef Ellaidhoo)
- Fesdu (W Retreat and Spa - Maldives)
- Gangehi (Gangehi Island Resort)
- Halaveli (Constance Halaveli)
- Kandholhudhoo (Kandholhu Island)
- Kudafolhudhoo (Nika Island Resort)
- Kuramathi (Kuramathi Island Resort)
- Maayafushi (VOI Maayafushi Resort)
- Velidhoo (Velidhu Island Resort)
- Veligandu (Veligandu Island Resort and Spa)

Alif Dhaalu Atoll

- Athuruga (Diamonds Athuruga)
- Dhidhdhoofinolhu (LUX* South Ari Atoll)
- Huvahendhoo (Lily Beach Resort and Spa)
- Kudarah (Amaya Resort Kudarah)
- Maafushivaru (Maafushivaru)
- Machchafushi (Centara Grand Island Resort and Spa Maldives)
- Mirihi (Mirihi Island Resort)
- Moofushi (Constance Moofushi)
- Rangalifinolhu (Conrad Maldives Rangali Island)
- Theluveligaa (Drift Thelu Veliga by Castaway)
- Thudufushi (Diamonds Thudufushi)
- Vakarufalhi (Vakarufalhi Island Resort)
- Vilamendhoo (Vilamendhoo Island Resort and Spa)

Vaavu Atoll

- Alimatha (Alimatha Aquatic Resort)
- Dhiggiri (VOI Dhiggiri Resort)
- Thinadhoo (Cinnamon Velifushi)

Meemu Atoll

- Medhufushi (Medhufushi Island Resort)
- Hakuraahuraa (Cinnamon Haakuraa Huraa)

Faafu Atoll

- Filitheyo (Filitheyo Island Resort)

Dhaalu Atoll

- Aluvifushi (Sun Siyam Iru Veli Maldives)
- Dhoores (aaaVeee Nature's Paradise Maldives)
- Meedhuffushi (Sun Siyam Vilu Reef Maldives)
- Velavaru (Angsana Velavaru Resort)
- Vommuli (St. Regis Vommuli)

== Services ==
Services provided by the company include:

- Scenic flights
- Resort transfers
- Picnic flights
- Aircraft charter
- Domestic air services

== Fleet ==
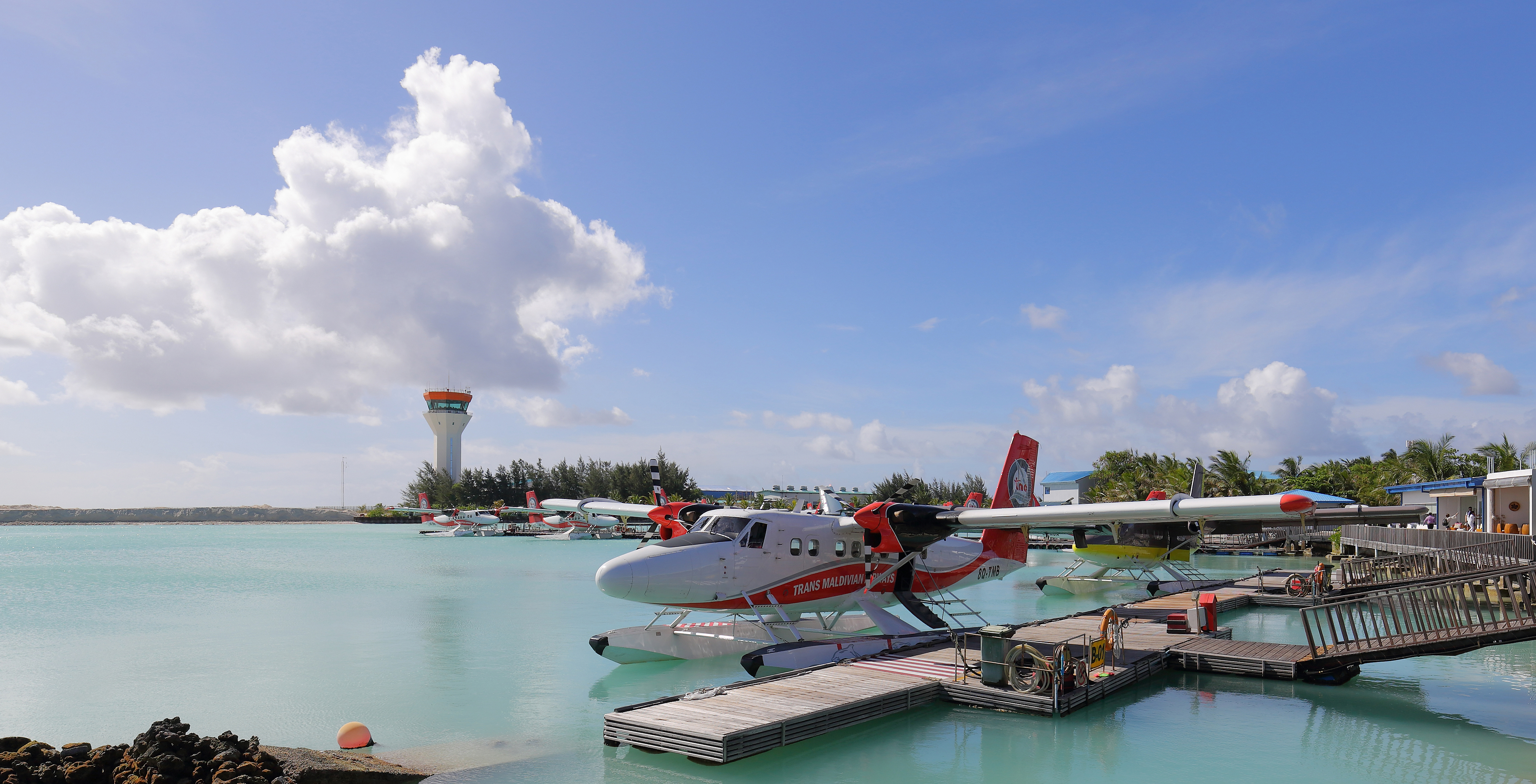
A DHC-6 Twin Otter at Velana International Airport

As of August 2025, Trans Maldivian Airways operates the following aircraft:

Trans Maldivian Airways fleet
Aircraft	In service	On order	Passengers	Notes
de Havilland Canada DHC-6 Twin Otter Series 100	1		15	
de Havilland Canada DHC-6 Twin Otter Series 200	1		15	
de Havilland Canada DHC-6 Twin Otter Series 200HG	1		15	
de Havilland Canada DHC-6 Twin Otter Series 300	59		15	
Viking Air DHC-6 Twin Otter Series 400	3		15	
Total	65			

== Incidents and accidents ==
As Trans Maldivian Airways the company suffered the following accidents:

- On 19 February 2001, a De Havilland Canada DHC-6 Twin Otter Series 100 (8Q-TMA) collided with a De Havilland Canada DHC-6 Twin Otter Series 300 (8Q-TMH) while landing at Holiday Island Resort. No one was injured.
- On 17 May 2004, a De Havilland Canada DHC-6 Twin Otter Series 300 collided with the sea-wall of runway 18 at Ibrahim Nasir International Airport after experiencing problems taking off from the seaplane base at Hulhule, adjacent to the international airport. Both pilots and one passenger were seriously injured in the accident. The aircraft, SN 434, was written off. Subsequently, SN 434 was rebuilt by Viking Air Limited to serve as the technical demonstrator (proof of concept) aircraft for Series 400 Twin Otter development. It flew again as a Series 400 prototype in the fall of 2008, and is currently registered as C-FDHT.
- On 27 May 2017, a De Havilland Canada DHC-6 Twin Otter Series 100 (8Q-TMV) landed on Male's sea plane port at 08:33L (03:33Z) but tipped over to the left and came to a stop partly submerged with the nose and left wing tip below the water surface.
- On 13 November 2021, a De Havilland Canada DHC-6 Twin Otter Series 100 (8Q-MBC) struck an overwater villa at the Finolhu Hotel Resort on Baa Atoll as it was taking off for Male's sea plane port. The aircraft suffered damage to the right wing, propeller and engine while the villa had minor damage. No persons were seriously injured.
- On June 9, 2024, a De Havilland Canada DHC-6-300 Twin Otter amphibious aircraft was involved in an incident upon landing at the Westin Maldives Miriandhoo Resort. The luxury resort is located on Dharavandhoo Island, Baa Atoll, in the Maldives. Images and videos posted on social media shortly after the event show the aircraft listing to starboard after one of its floats apparently became detached.
