= Kanifushi =

Kanifushi may refer to the following places in the Maldives:

- Kanifushi (Baa Atoll)
- Kanifushi (Lhaviyani Atoll)
