= Geydhoshu Kandu =

The Geydhoshu Kandu is the narrow and deep channel in between Fasdhoothere and Southern Maalhosmadulu Atoll of the Maldives.
