= Landaa Giraavaru =

Coordinates: 5°17′12″N 73°06′43″E

Four Seasons at Landaagiraavaru (Landaa Giraavaru)
- island resort
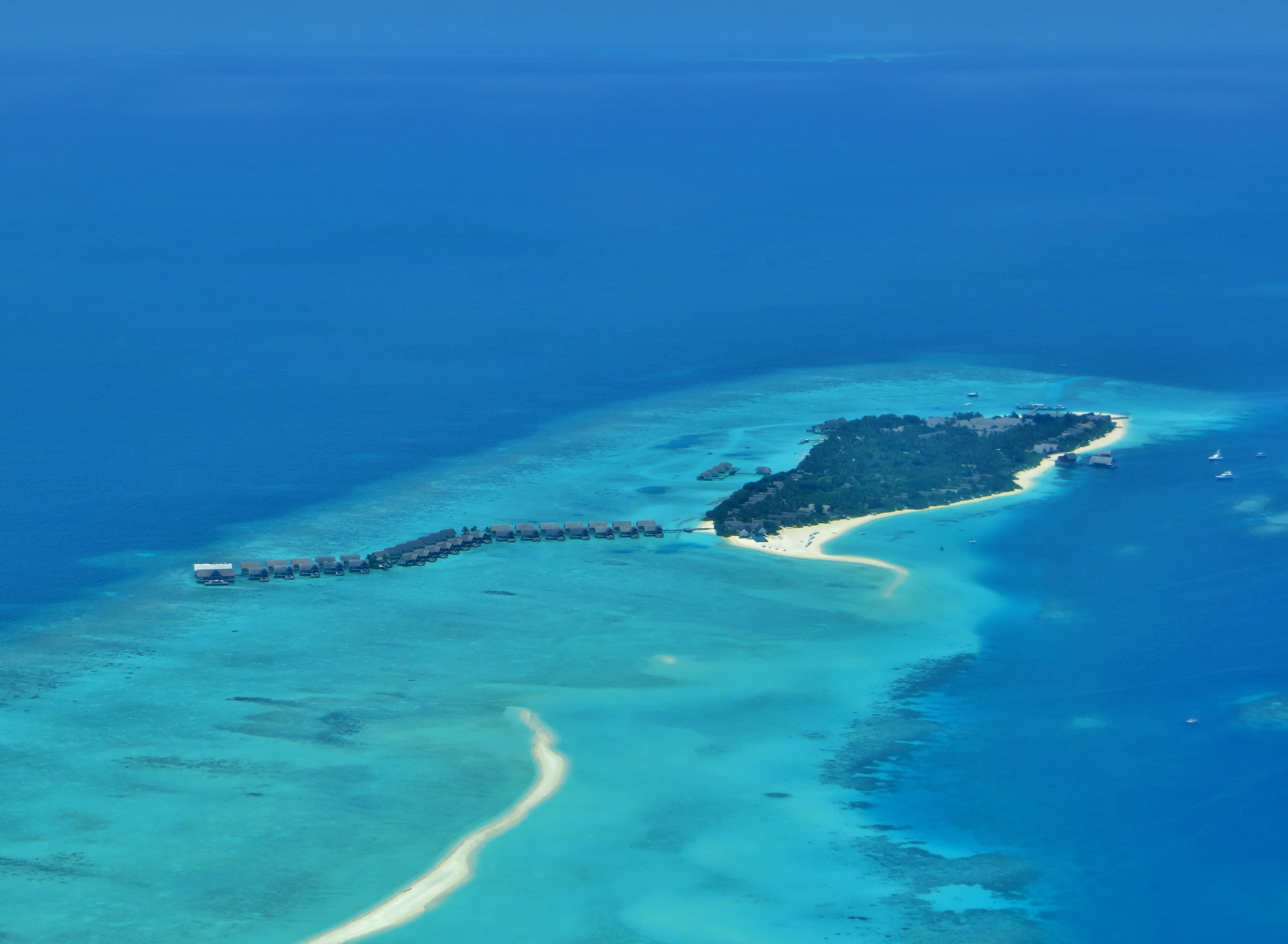
- Landaa Giraavaru

- Location in Maldives
- Country: Maldives
- Administrative atoll: Baa Atoll

Area
  - Total: 0.178 km^{2} (0.069 sq mi)
- Time zone: UTC+05:00 (MST)

Landaa Giraavaru is an island in the Baa Atoll in the Maldives (UNESCO World Biosphere Reserve). The entire island has been home to the luxury Four Seasons at Landaagiraavaru resort since 2004. Operated by Four Seasons Hotels and Resorts, with rates from US$1,400 per night, it is one of the many island resorts of the Maldives.

== Geography ==
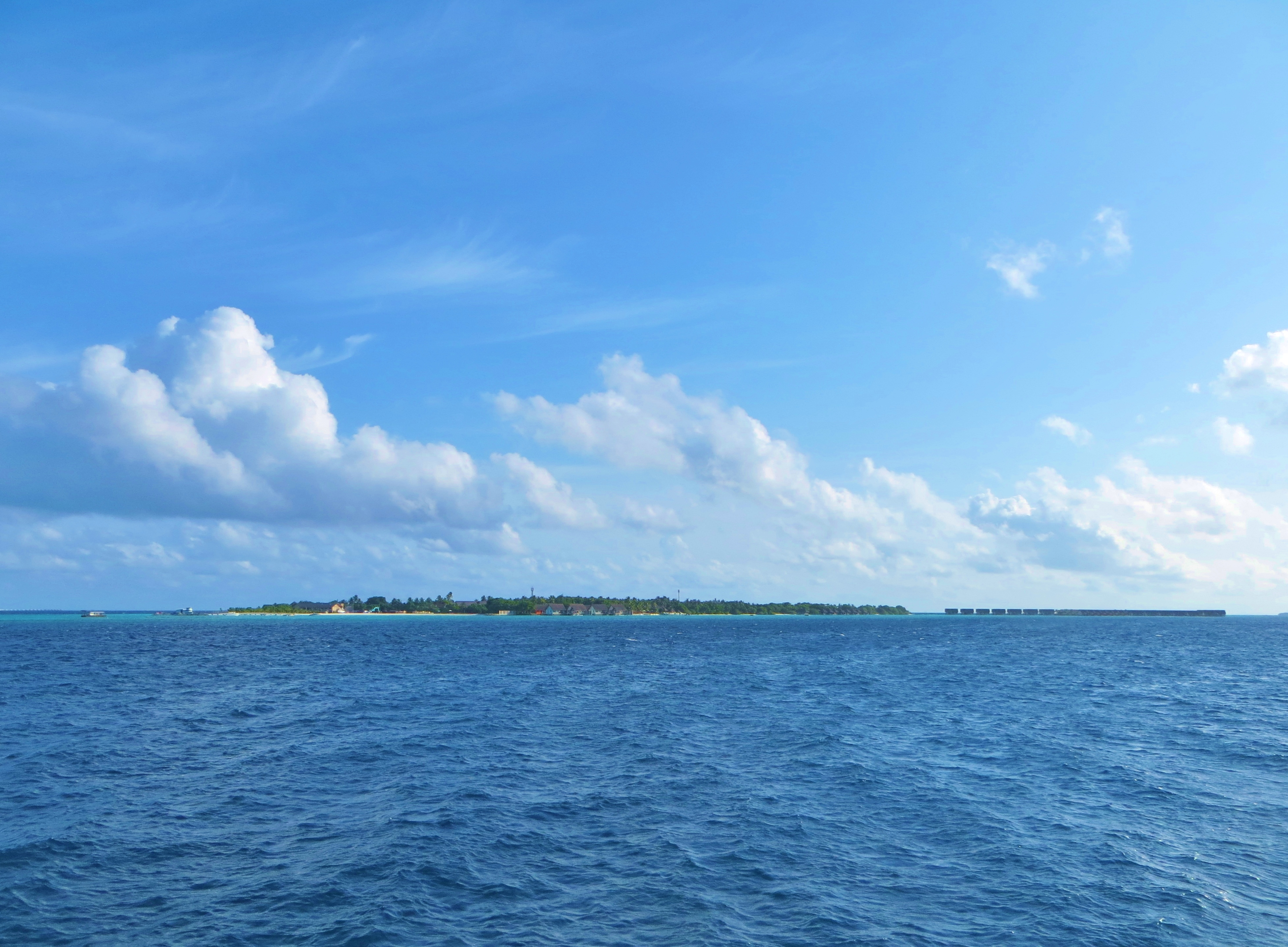
Landaa Giraavaru seen from the north-east

=== Localization ===
Landaa Giraavaru is one of the Maldive Islands, located in the northeast of Baa Atoll. The closest inhabited islands are Kamadhoo in the southeast and Kudarikilu in the northwest, but there are also numerous desert islands around, such as Thiladhoo, Milhaidhoo or Madhirivaadhoo in the south, which offer as many diving sites.

=== Relief and morphology ===
Landaa Giraavaru is approximately 600 meters in length from east to west, and 200 meters at its maximum width; its maximum height does not exceed 2 meters. It mostly consists of sand, which makes it a motu.

== Flora and fauna ==
=== Terrestrial biodiversity ===
Landaa Giraavaru is covered with dense tropical vegetation, including in particular takamakas, coconut palm trees and screwpines.

=== Marine biodiversity ===
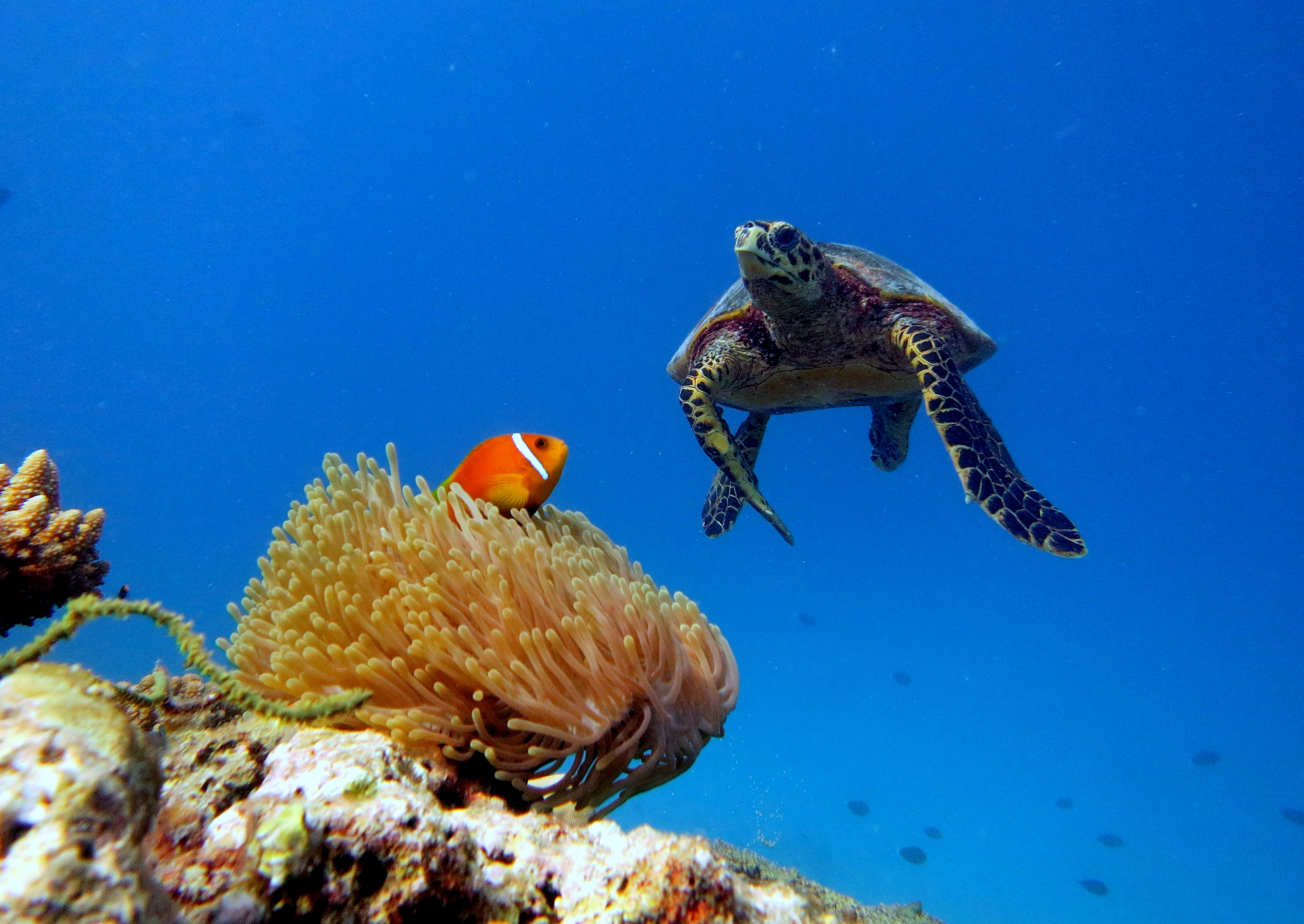
A typical underwater landscape of Baa atoll close to Landaa Giraavaru, with a hawksbill turtle and a Maldivian clownfish in its anemone.

The island is located inside the "Baa Atoll UNESCO Biosphere Reserve", designated by the UNESCO in 2011. Its shallow waters, particularly rich in coral, fish and an important population of whale sharks and manta rays have gained the atoll a reputation for exceptional diving. The ecosystem is characterized by a very high cover rate coral, very diverse and dominated by several species of tabular, branching or digitate corals of the genus Acropora. In addition to a high number of pelagics, the surrounding waters shelter many large marine animals such as sea turtles, dolphins, moray eels, tuna and groupers. This atoll is also famous for important populations of spectacular big animals such as whale sharks and manta rays.

=== Conservation ===
The resort shelters its own "Marine Discovery Centre" with several full-time biologists, scientific divers and researchers, managed by local environmental organization Seamarc/Marine savers. Particular projects of focus include the care and rehabilitation of wounded animals (turtles, cetaceans), surveys of the local macrofauna (turtles, rays, whale sharks) and an ambitious program of reimplantation of coral in damaged areas (known onsite as Reefscapers), mostly funded by tourists. The MDC also provides popularization course and conferences about marine life, aimed at resort guests, local islanders and marine biology apprentices.

== History ==
Probably discovered during the prehistory at the same time as the other islands of the Maldives, Landaa Giraavaru may have been inhabited in an intermittent way because of the low availability in fresh water, even if remains of sedentary occupation were found in the northeast of the island. This population probably migrated to the close island of Kamadhoo at the beginning of the 20th century to settle the present village there. Before the opening of the hotel, the island was only punctually inhabited by one Maldivian tribe, about 10-12 people, who exploited the coconuts and certain products of the sea thanks to a regular supply from Kudarikilu there. When Resort was opened, they were offered to stay in resort for lifetime. First man died in 2007 and left his name to the restaurant of the employees, Café Umarbe.

In November 2004, the island became home to the second Maldivian resort of the Four Seasons hotel management company, and now employs approximately 500 workers and covers the entire 178062 m^{2} of the island.

== Tourism ==
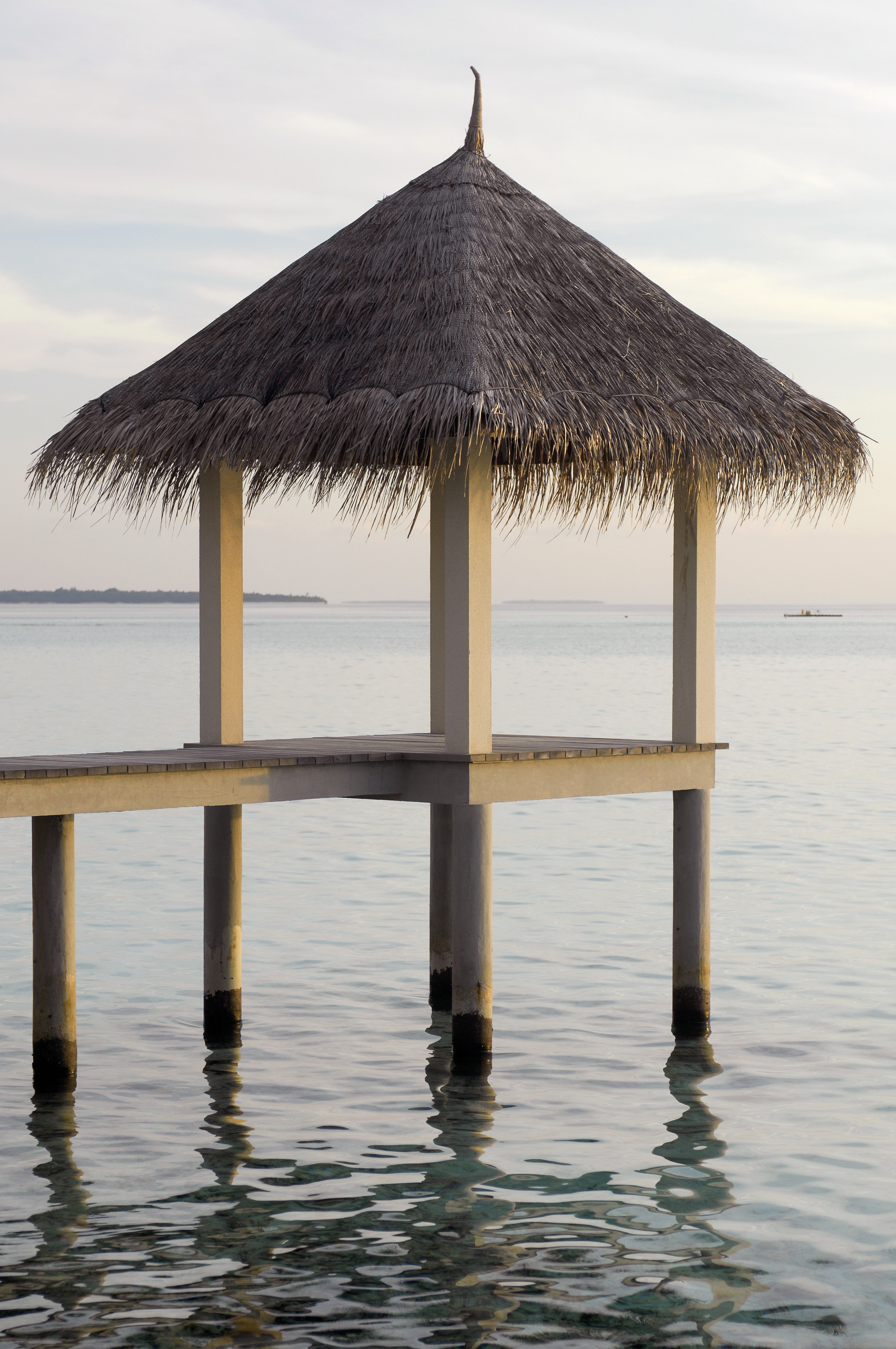
Resting place.

The presence of the luxury resort Four Seasons Resort Maldives at Landaa Giraavaru makes this site one of the numerous island resorts of the Maldives, and it consists of 103 villas on the shore of the beach on stilts over the lagoon, eight restaurants and bars, a three-acre spa and ayurvedic retreat, a Professional Association of Diving Instructors 5-Star IDC dive centre, a marine discovery centre, many leisure and entertainment facilities, as well as a fleet of boats.

The access to the island from Malé and its international airport distant from about 130 kilometres is via a 35-minute seaplane flight.

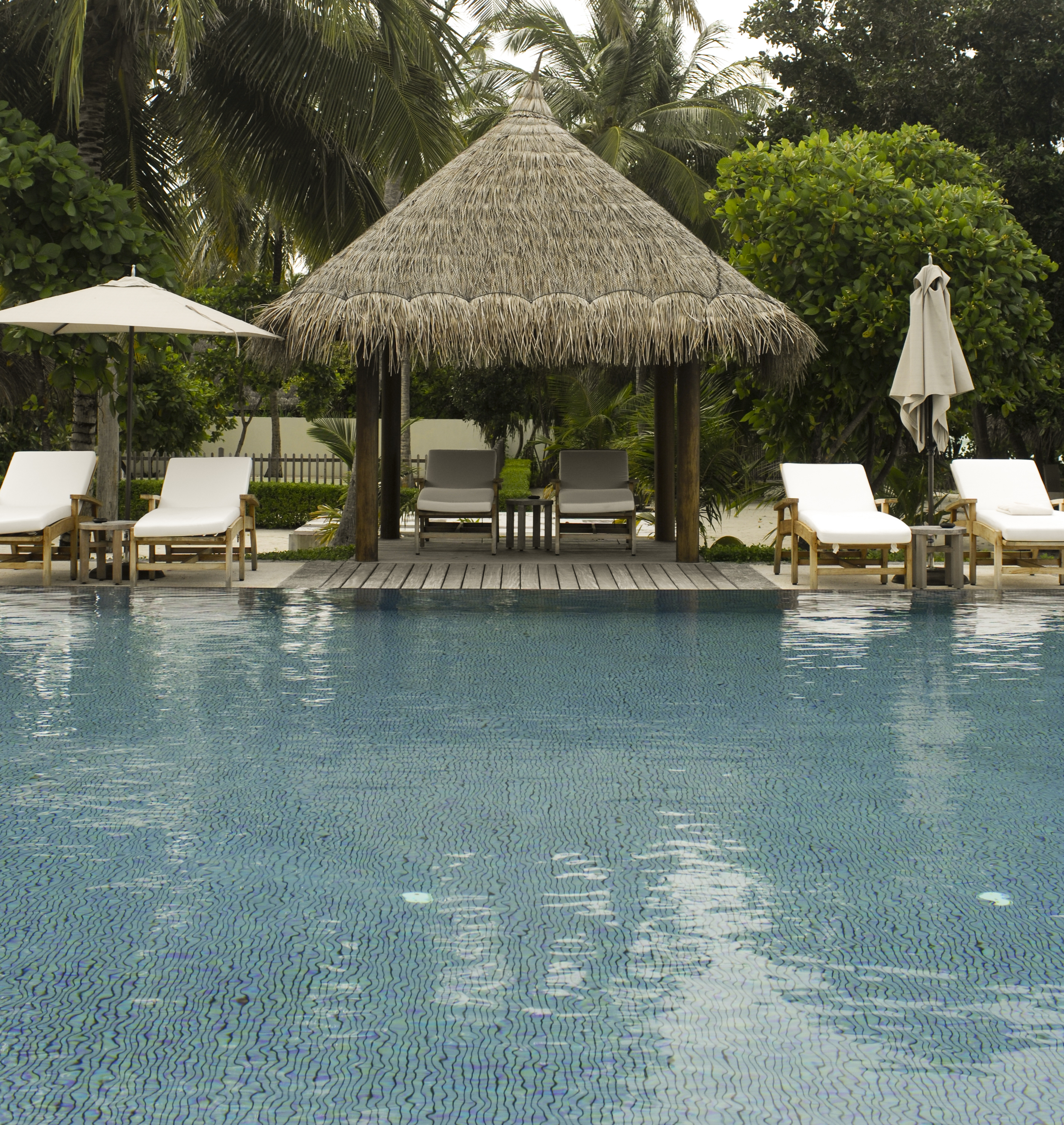
One of the resort's swimming pools

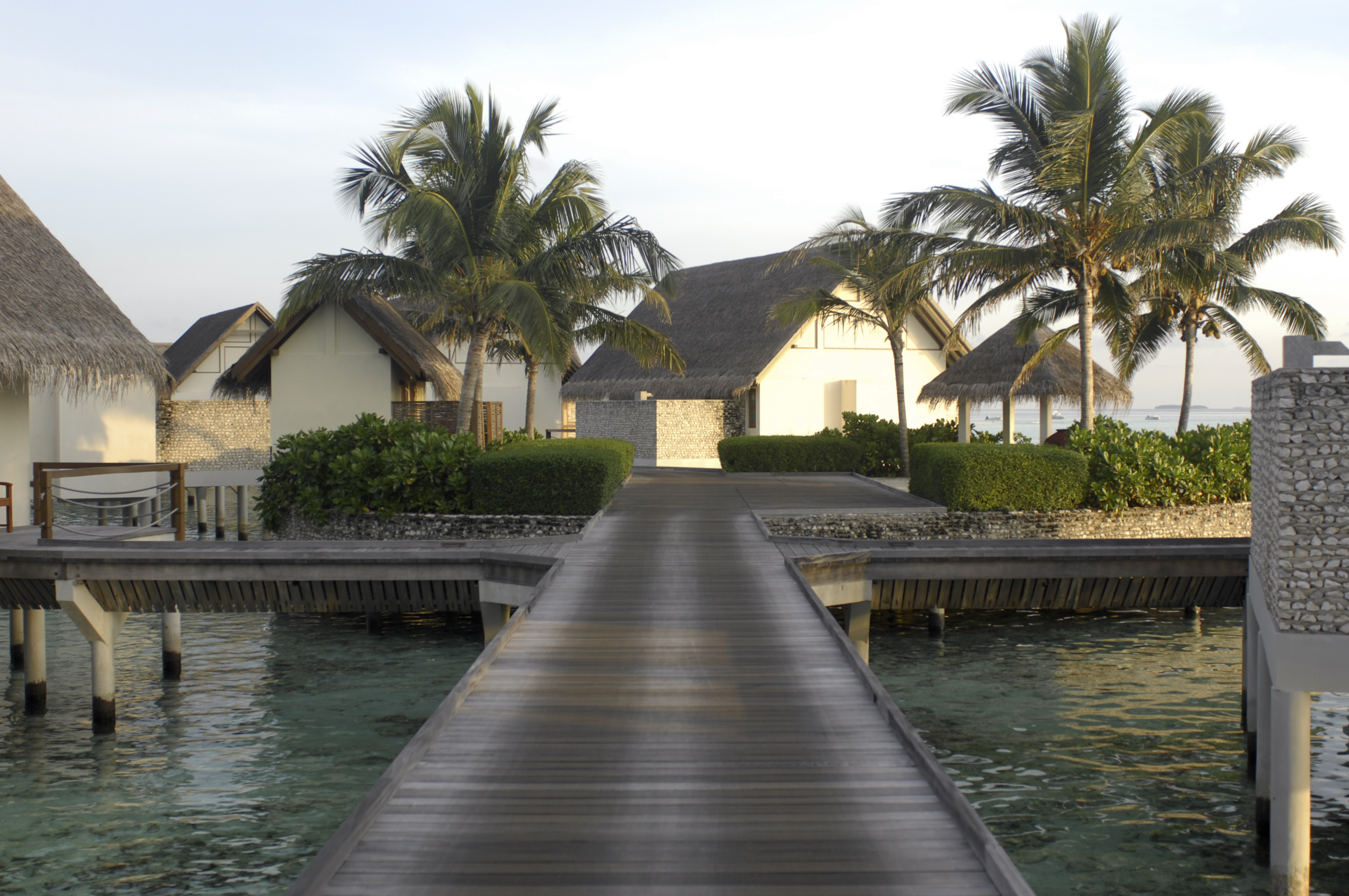
Water villas alley

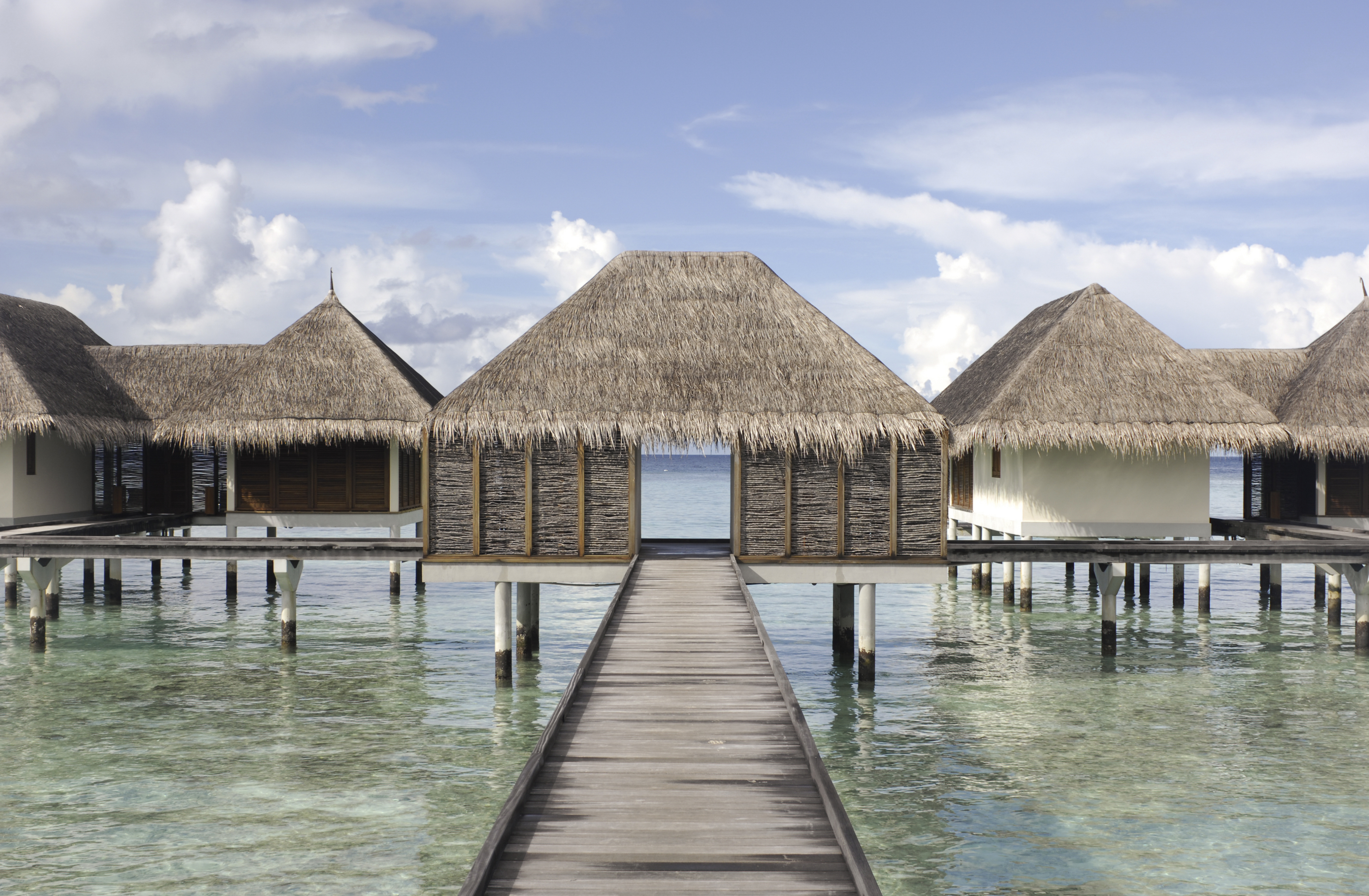
Part of the pile dwellings of the spa
