= Thulhaadhoo =

Thulhaadhoo ތުޅާދޫ
- Inhabited island
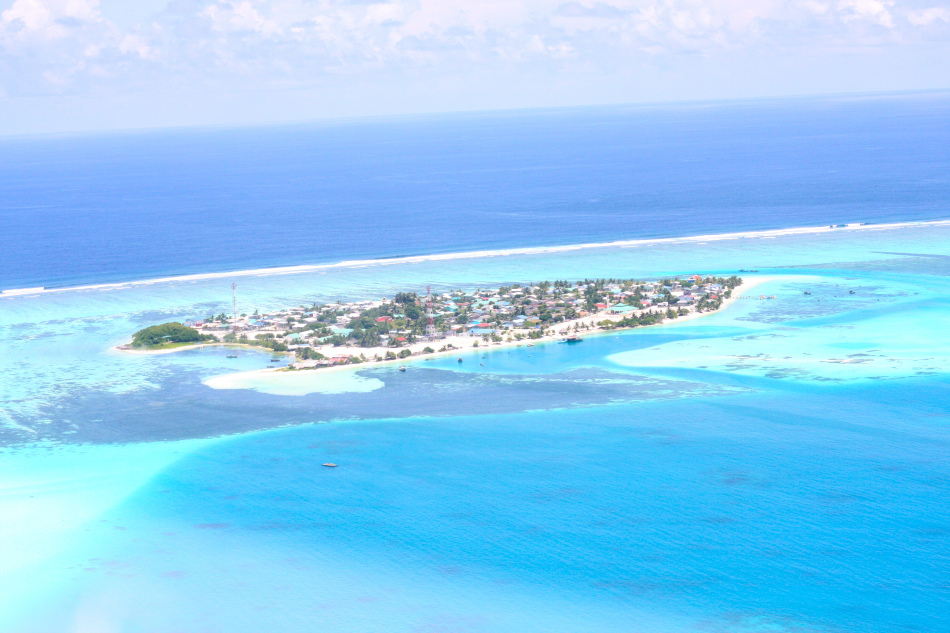
- Aerial view of Thulhaadhoo

- Location in Maldives
- Coordinates: 5°1′23″N 72°50′23″E
- Country: Maldives
- Administrative atoll: Baa Atoll
- Distance to Malé: 119.59 km (74.31 mi)

Government
  - Type: Mayor–council government
  - Body: Baa Thulhaadhoo Island Council
  - President: Ibrahim Adil (IND)

Area
  - Total: 40 ha (99 acres)

Dimensions
  - Length: 0.380 km (0.236 mi)
  - Width: 0.230 km (0.143 mi)

Population (2022)
  - Total: 1,471
  - Density: 3,700/km^{2} (9,500/sq mi)
- Time zone: UTC+05:00 (MST)
- Postal code: 06090

Thulhaadhoo (Dhivehi: ތުޅާދޫ) is the second highest populated inhabited island of Baa Atoll.

== History ==
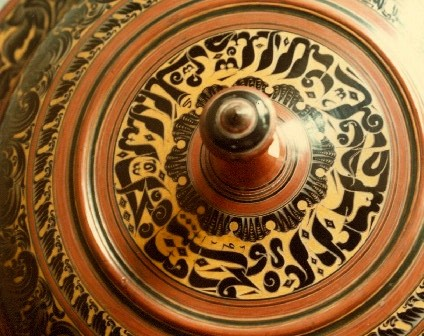
Old Malaafaiy wooden food cover with Arabic inscription. From Thulhadhoo, kept at the National Museum, Maldives

The island has been reclaimed by the government recently. The island is famous for its lacquer work. It used to supply the noble families in the country with lacquered items, but now most of Thulhaadhoo's lacquer work is sold to tourists as souvenirs.

== Geography ==
The island is 119.59 km (74 mi; 65 nmi) north of the country's capital, Malé.

== Demography ==
Historical population
Year	Pop.	±%
2006	1,759	—
2014	1,412	−19.7%
2019	2,999	+112.4%
2022	1,471	−51.0%
2006-2014: Census populations Source:

== Governance ==
=== Thulhaadhoo Council ===
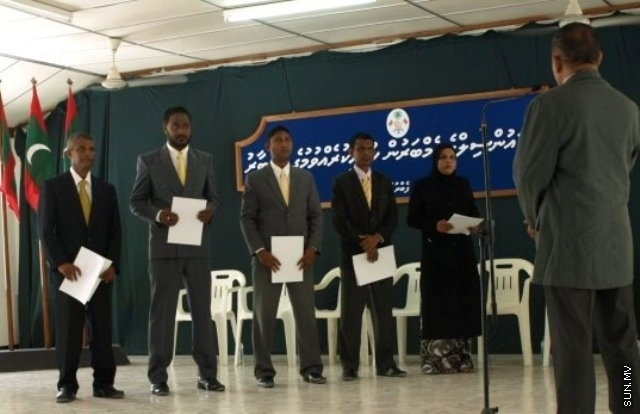
2013 members of Thulhaadhoo Council taking oath

The island is administered by a council of five members. The main objectives of this council are to make sure the well being of the island's citizens and to provide the basic needs of the people. The council is seen very active in the development of the island, although critics have risen against it.

Umaira Aboobakr, who was the only Dhivehi Rayyithunge Party (DRP) member in the council, which held the majority of Maldivian Democratic Party (MDP) with its four members, was faced with major difficulties working with the council. The disputes within the council reached its peak, when the four MDP members took a vote in the middle of 2011 to sack Umaira claiming that "she had not attended seven council meetings in a row." A by-election was announced by the Elections Commission, but later that year, the Maldivian High Court cancelled the election and said that "the announcement on 5 October 2011 by Elections Commission for by-elections of B. Thulhaadhoo to be held on 19 November 2011, was made without fulfilling the requirements previously ordered by the High Court".

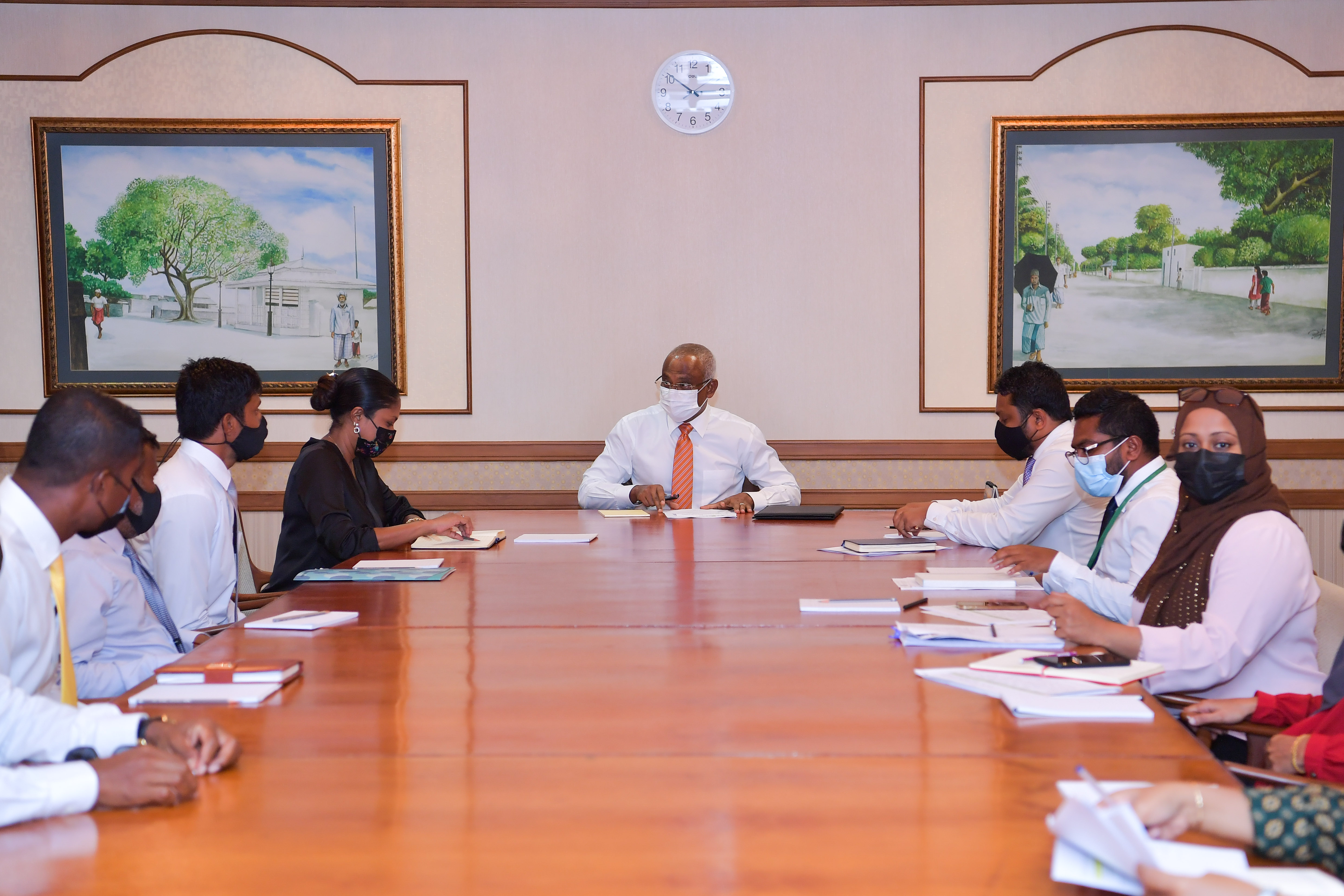
President Ibrahim Mohamed Solih with members of the Thulhaadhoo Council

Currently, Thulhaadhoo council has 7 councillors, including the council president, 3 Male councillors among which one is the vice president and 3 female councillors. The president and one of the female councillors were independent candidates whereas the other 5 councillors are from Maldivian Democratic Party.

== Education ==
The island has one school headed by principal Ahmed Abdulla. In the year 2019 Ahmed Abdulla resigned from the post due to health issues. Ibrahim Rasheed is the current principal of Thulhaadhoo school. There are two pre schools in Thulhaadhoo, 2 of which is own by a private organisation.

== Healthcare ==
Thulhaadhoo's Health Centre became famous when Dr. Muhammad Owais Aziz recorded the first case of swine flu in Maldives.
