= Finolhas =

Coordinates: 5.2343°N 73.1140°E

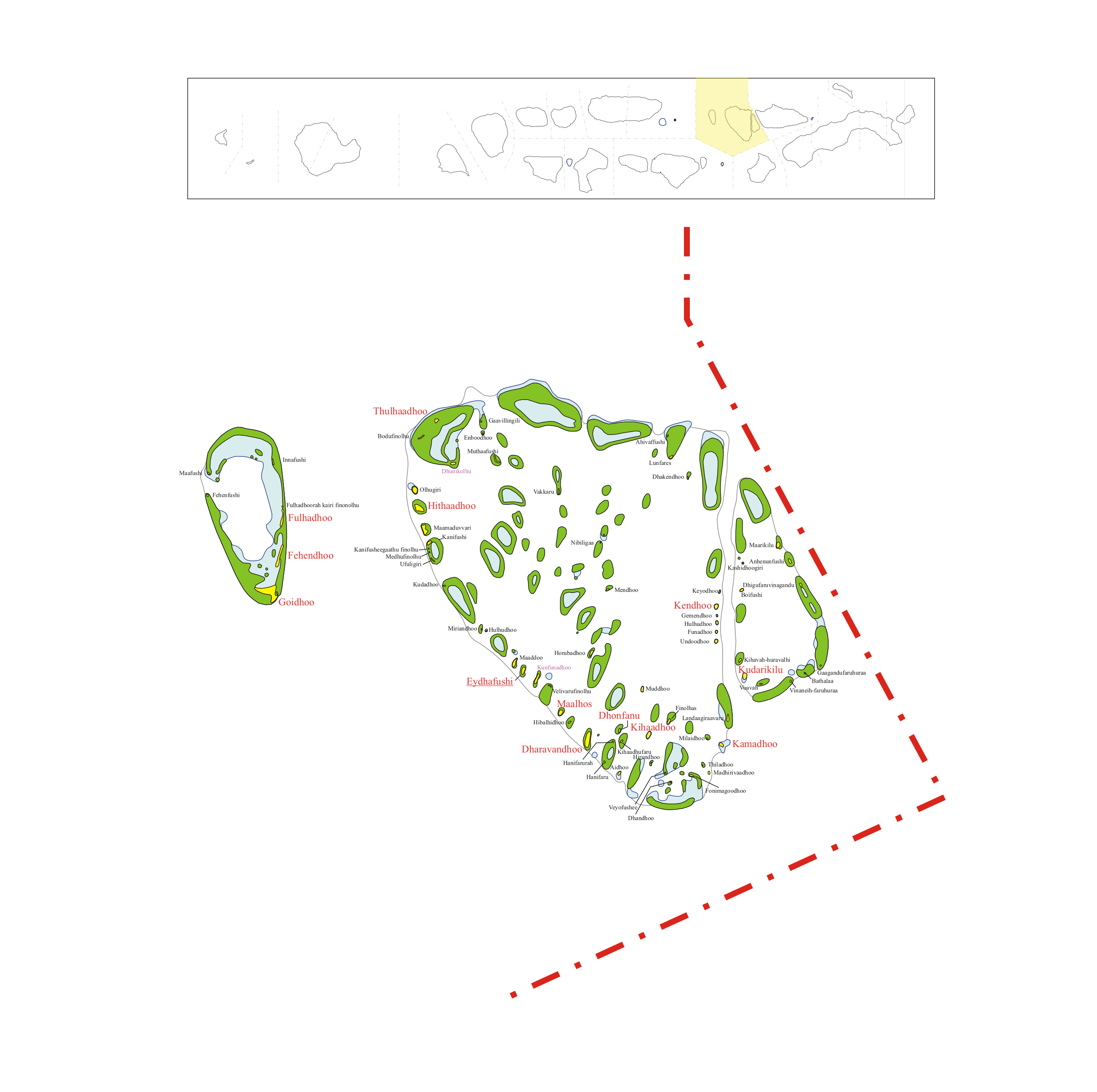
Baa Atoll

Finolhas is an uninhabited island of the Baa Atoll, an administrative division and geographically part of Southern Maalhosmadulu Atoll of the Maldives. The island was previously inhabited and abandoned only during the reign of Sultan Hassan Nooraddeen I for unknown reasons.

It is now owned by The Small Maldives Island Company and operates as Amilla Maldives Resort and Residences.
