= Kamadhoo =

- Inhabited island
- Location in Maldives
- Coordinates: 05°16′59″N 73°08′10″E
- Country: Maldives
- Administrative atoll: Baa Atoll
- Distance to Malé: 129.29 km (80.34 mi)

Dimensions
  - Length: 0.550 km (0.342 mi)
  - Width: 0.480 km (0.298 mi)

Population (2014)
  - Total: 552
- including foreigners
- Time zone: UTC+05:00 (MST)

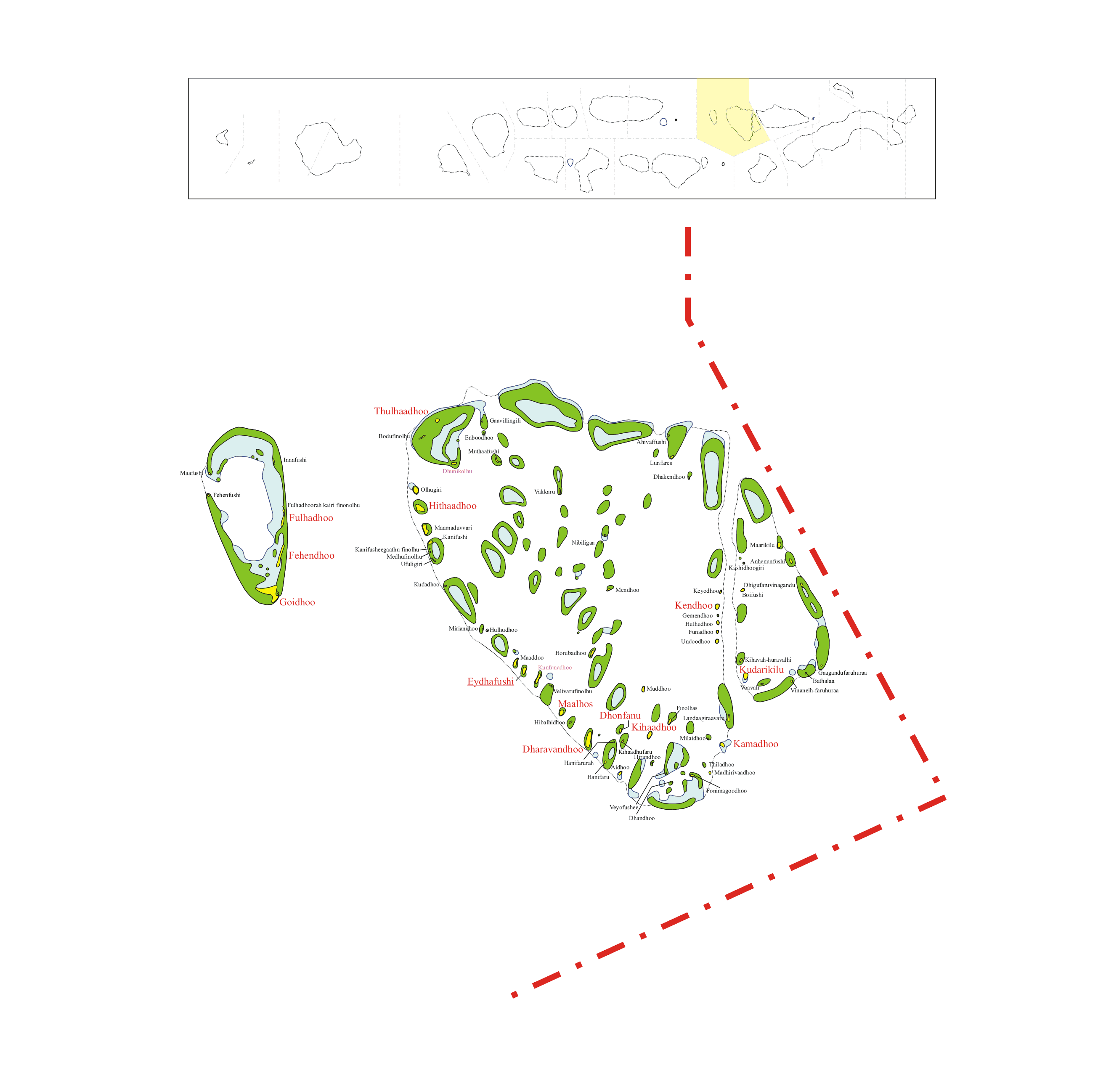
Baa Atoll

Kamadhoo (Dhivehi: ކަމަދޫ) is one of the inhabited islands of Baa Atoll.

== Geography ==
The island is 129.29 km (80 mi; 70 nmi) north of the country's capital, Malé.

== Demography ==
Historical population
Year	Pop.	±%
2006	231	—
2014	354	+53.2%
2022	552	+55.9%
2006-2022: Census populations Source:
