= Maldivian Air Taxi =

Domestic airline in the Maldives

IATA	ICAO	Call sign
MV	MAT	"AIR-TAXI"
- Founded: 4 November 1993; 32 years ago
- Ceased operations: 2013; 13 years ago (integrated into Trans Maldivian Airways)
- Hubs: Ibrahim Nasir International Airport
- Fleet size: 20
- Destinations: 52
- Headquarters: Malé
- Key people: Lars Erik Nielsen (Founder and chairman of the board)
- Website: http://www.maldivianairtaxi.com

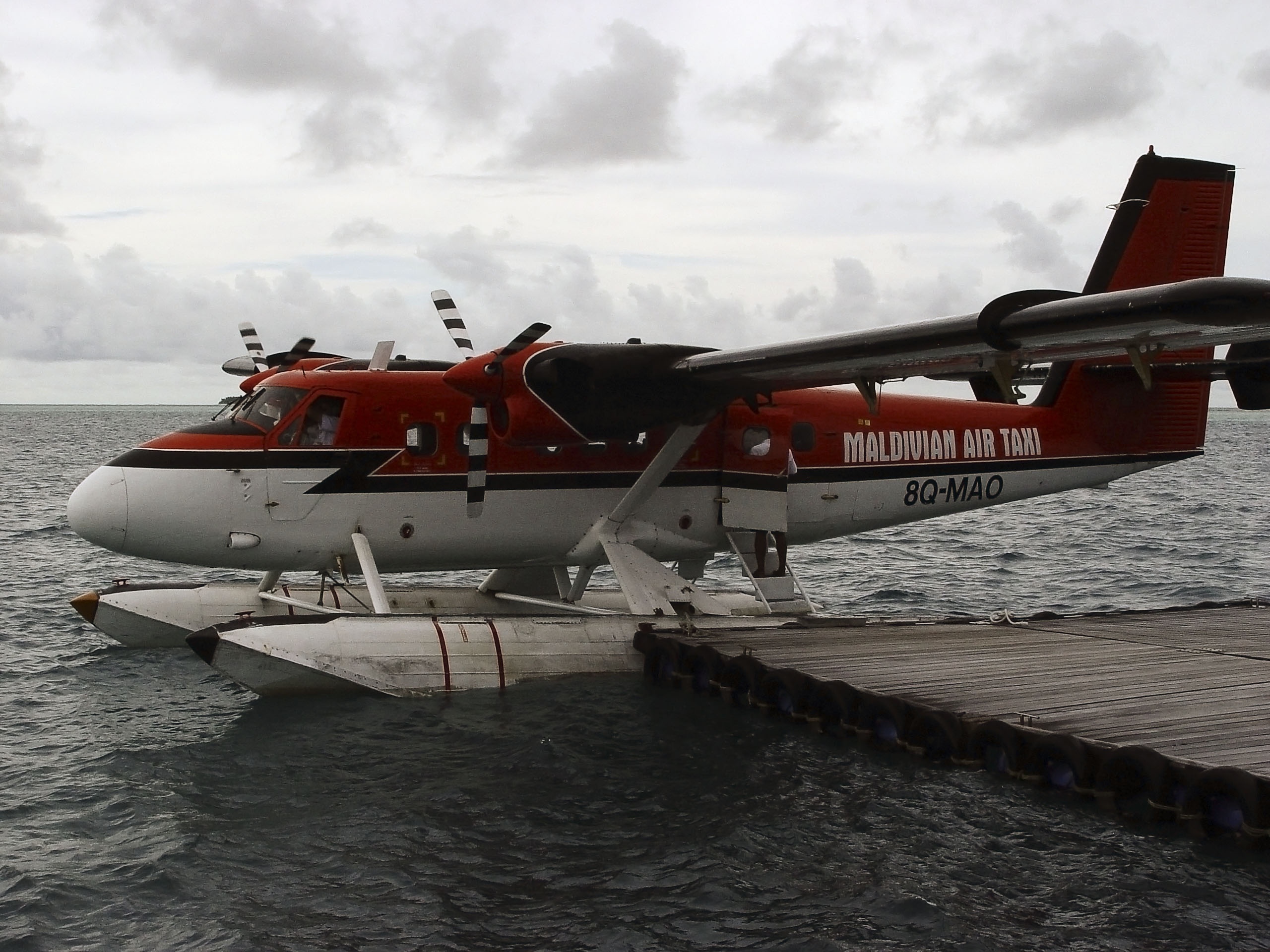
Flight 8Q-MAO (in Kenn Borek Air colours) preparing for boarding.

Maldivian Air Taxi (MAT) was a domestic carrier in the Maldives and was one of the largest seaplane operators in the world, operating over 500 flights a week during the peak tourist season. Beginning in November 1993 with two aircraft, MAT grew in direct response to the opening of newly developed resorts that require seaplane transport services for their guests.

In 2013, The Blackstone Group, an American equity fund, announced that they were acquiring both MAT and rival company Trans Maldivian Airways (TMA). A merger was brought underway and a new company was founded, retaining the Trans Maldivian Airways name, and the colours of MAT. TMA now operates 44 De Havilland Canada DHC-6 Twin Otters, including three brand new 400 series.

== History ==
The airline was established in 1993 by Danish investors and started operations in the same year. It was wholly owned by Lars Erik Nielsen (chairman) and as of March 2007 had 275 employees.

== Fleet ==
At the time of the merger in December 2010, Maldivian Air Taxi's fleet included the following aircraft.

- 1 de Havilland Canada DHC-6 Twin Otter Series 100
- 1 de Havilland Canada DHC-6 Twin Otter Series 200
- 19 de Havilland Canada DHC-6 Twin Otter Series 300

Maldivian Air Taxi also had previously indicated plans to replace all of their DHC-6-100/-200/-300's with the new −400 series by Viking Air.
