= Kihaadhoo =

Kihaadhoo ކިހާދޫ
- Island
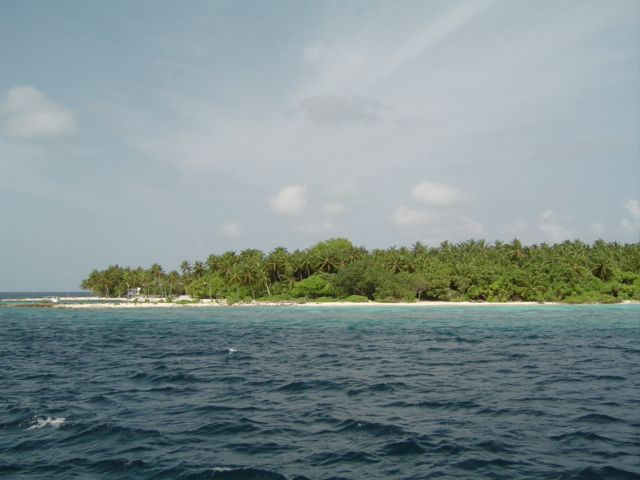
- View of Kihaadhoo from west side

- Location in Maldives
- Coordinates: 05°12′56″N 73°07′30″E
- Country: Maldives
- Geographic atoll: Maalhosmadulu Dhekunuburi
- Administrative atoll: Baa Atoll
- Distance to Malé: 122.67 km (76.22 mi)

Government
  - Council: Ahmed Rasheed (P), Abdulla Faisal, Mohamed Ashraf, Mohamed Shareef, Abdulla Muaz

Area
  - Total: 0.265 km^{2} (0.102 sq mi)

Dimensions
  - Length: 0.840 km (0.522 mi)
  - Width: 0.490 km (0.304 mi)

Population (2022)
  - Total: 481
  - Density: 1,820/km^{2} (4,700/sq mi)
- Time zone: UTC+05:00 (MST)
- Assigned Letter: F-6

Kihaadhoo (Dhivehi: ކިހާދޫ) is one of the inhabited islands of Baa Atoll.

== History ==
It was evident that the people have lived in the eastern part of the island at first, and moved to the current place about 80 years ago. The migration was mainly due to contamination of groundwater and increased death rate. There were so many stories regarding the migrations and the recent migration was only about 35 years ago, when people of Kihaadhoo was taken to Baa Hithaadhoo from which they came back due to discriminations and minority issues.

== Geography ==
The island is 122.67 km (76 mi; 66 nmi) north of the country's capital, Malé. The Island Kihaadhoo, is located in the northern central of South Maalhosmadulu or Baa Atoll. The island is relatively large with 31.4 hectares of land to its small population of around 500. The closest inhabited island is Dhonfanu, to which its takes only few minutes to go by a dhoani. The island has a small harbour for transporting goods and people from nearby islands.

== Demography ==
Historical population
Year	Pop.	±%
2006	275	—
2014	345	+25.5%
2022	481	+39.4%
2006-2014: Census populations Source:

== Economy ==
The main income for people of Kihaadhoo includes tourism, fishing and some agricultural activities. The island is famous in weaving from coconut leaves and it holds a strong name in the Maldivian society.

== Education ==
Kihaadhoo school which is now built at the western part of the island provide education for all school age children of Kihaadhoo and some students from neighboring places.

== Local Tourism ==
With the introduction of local tourism, Kihaadhoo has witnessed the establishment of its first guest house in 2022. The island has many activities for tourists including fishing, snorkelling and experiencing local food. The house reef of Kihaadhoo is a popular place for snorkelling among tourists from nearby resorts. The island also has a tourist beach where tourists can enjoy a relaxed environment.
