= Mudhdhoo =

- Island
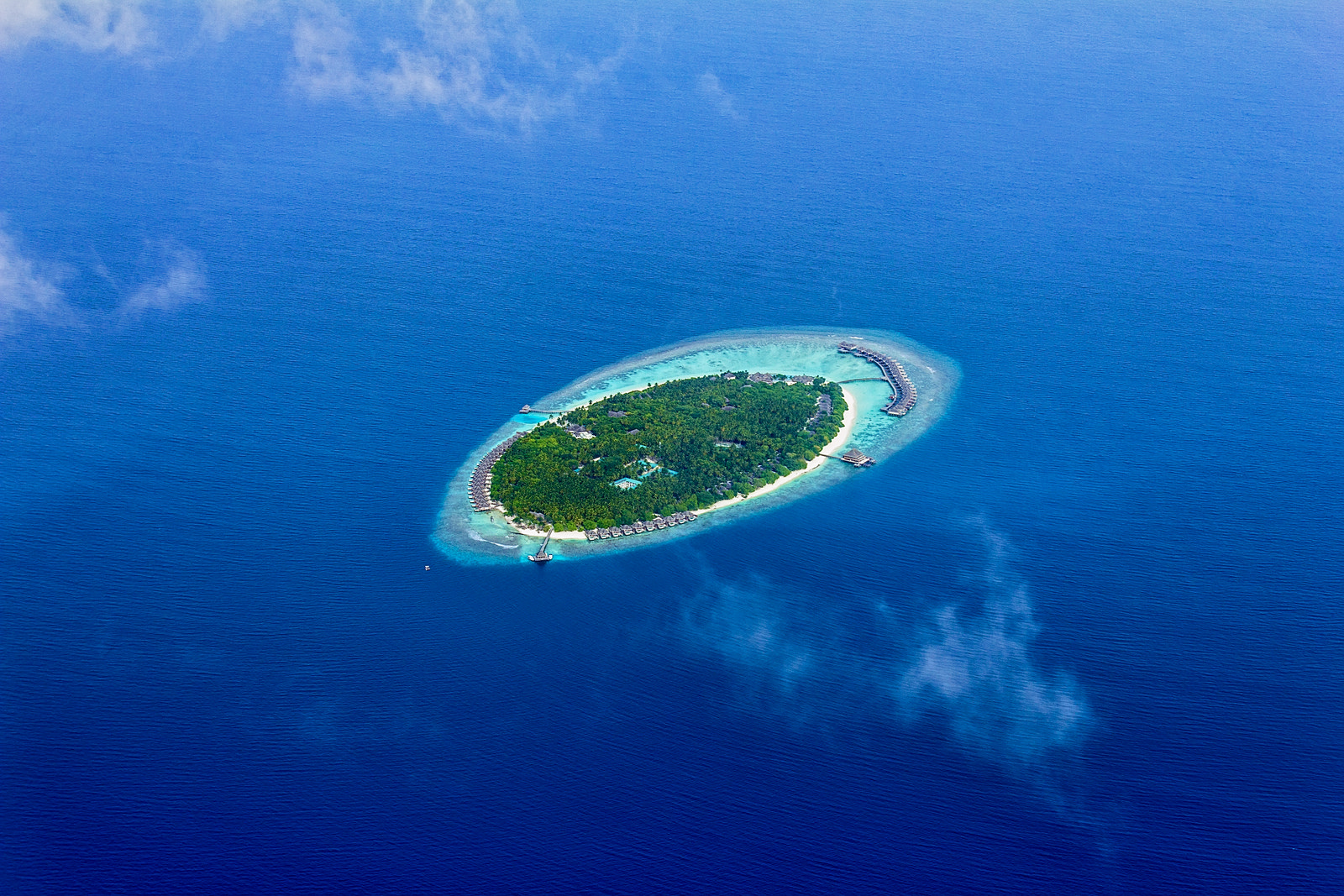

- Location in Maldives
- Coordinates: 05°12′22.3″N 73°05′05.3″E
- Country: Maldives
- Geographic atoll: Baa Atoll
- Administrative atoll: Baa Atoll
- Distance to Malé: 123 km (76 mi)
- Time zone: UTC+05:00 (MST)

Mudhdhoo, is an island in the Baa Atoll in the Maldives. It is the location of the Dusit Thani Maldives, a Dusit Thani Group resort hotel.
