= Reethi Beach =

Reethi Beach Fonimagoodhoo
- holiday island resort
- Location in Maldives
- Coordinates: 05°16′59″N 73°08′10″E
- Country: Maldives
- Administrative atoll: Baa Atoll

Area
  - Total: 0.11 km^{2} (0.042 sq mi)

Population (2014)
  - Total: 75
  - Density: 680/km^{2} (1,800/sq mi)
- Time zone: UTC+05:00 (MST)

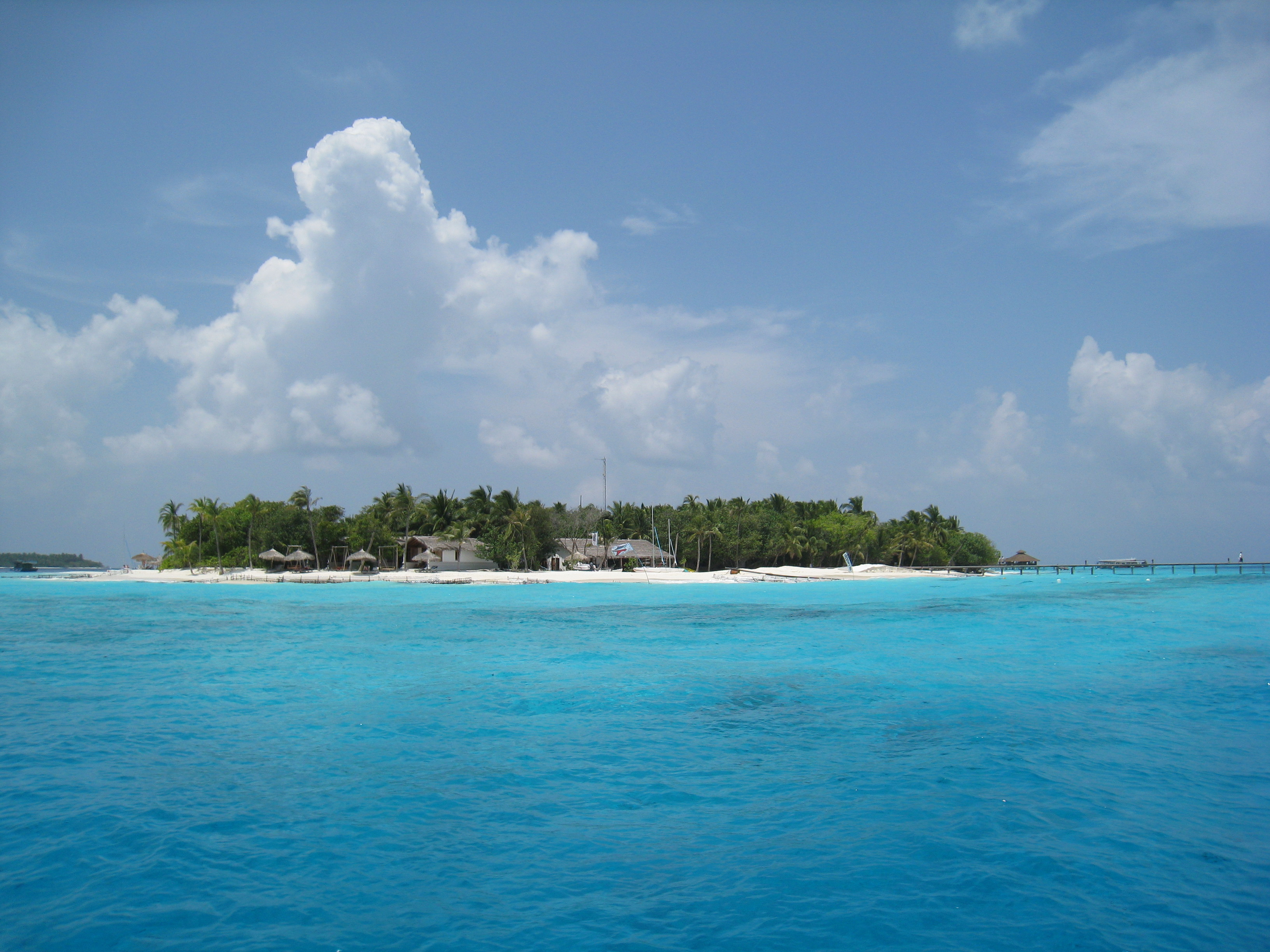
Fonimagoodhoo (Reethi Beach), Maldives

Fonimagoodhoo, often called Reethi Beach is an island in the Baa Atoll in the Maldives. On the island is the Reethi Beach resort.
