= Baa Atoll =

Coordinates: 5°08′N 72°57′E

- atoll of the Maldives
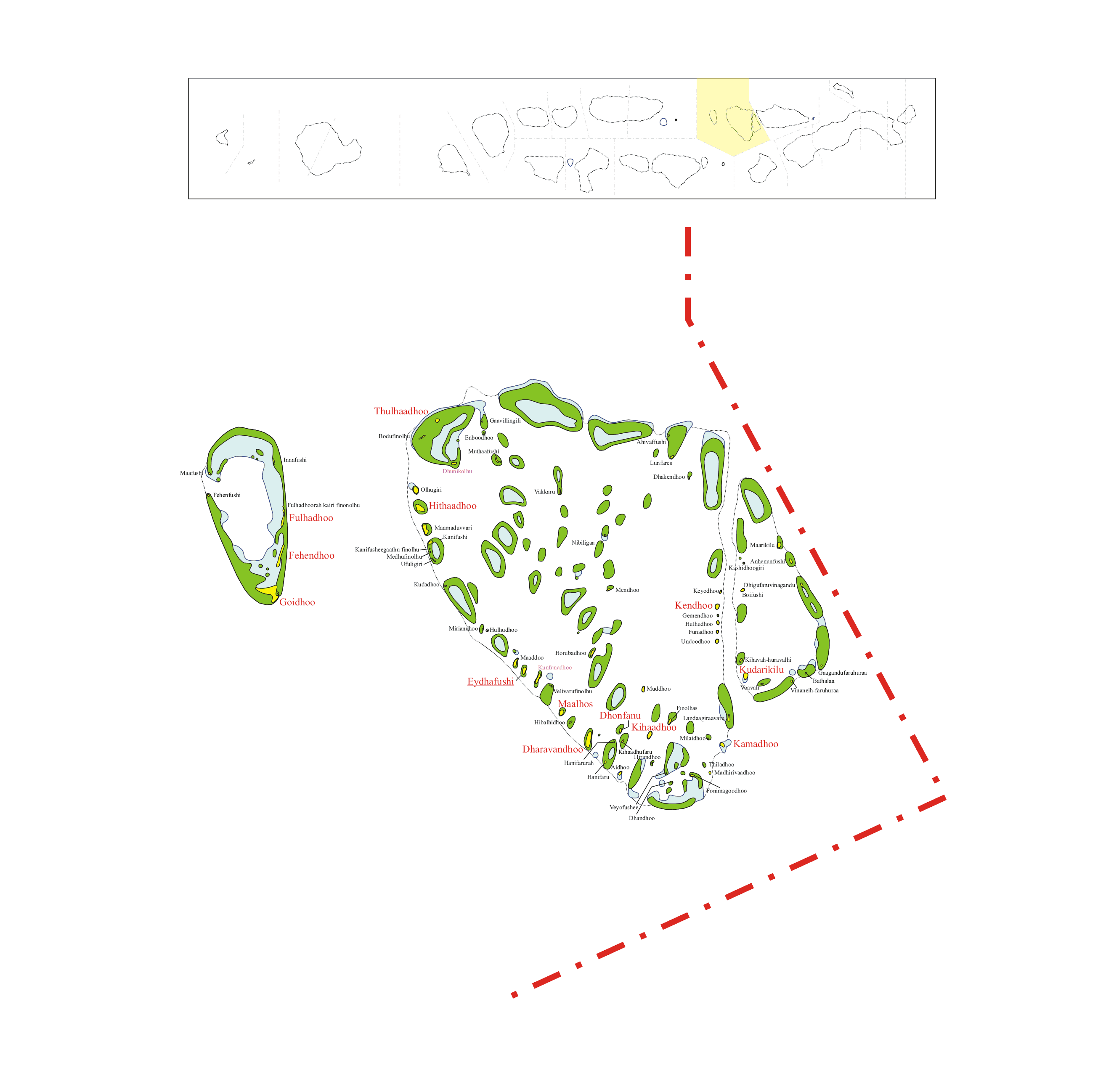

- Location of Baa in Maldives
- Country: Maldives
- Corresponding geographic atoll(s): Maalhosmadulu
- Location: 5° 23' N and 4° 49' N
- Capital: Eydhafushi

Government
  - Body: Baa Atoll Council
  - President: Ahmed Afrah (MDP)

Population
  - Total: 13,000
- Letter code: F
- Dhivehi letter code: B (ބ)
  - Number of islands: 75
  - Inhabited islands: Dharavandhoo * Dhonfanu * Eydhafushi * Fehendhoo * Fulhadhoo * Goidhoo * Hithaadhoo * Kamadhoo * Kendhoo * Kihaadhoo * Kudarikilu * Maalhos * Thulhaadhoo
  - Uninhabited islands: Ahivaffushi, Aidhoo, Anhenunfushi, Bathalaa, Bodufinolhu, Boifushi, Dhakendhoo, Dhandhoo, Dhigufaruvinagandu, Dhunikolhu, Enboodhoo, Fehenfushi, Finolhas, Fonimagoodhoo, Fulhadhoorah kairi finonolhu, Funadhoo, Gaagandufaruhuraa, Gaavillingili, Gemendhoo, Hanifaru, Hanifarurah, Hibalhidhoo, Hirundhoo, Horubadhoo, Hulhudhoo, Innafushi, Kanifusheegaathu finolhu, Kanifushi, Kashidhoogiri, Keyodhoo, Kihaadhufaru, Kihavah-huravalhi, Kudadhoo, Kunfunadhoo, Landaa Giraavaru, Lunfares, Maaddoo, Maafushi, Maamaduvvari, Maarikilu, Madhirivaadhoo, Medhufinolhu, Mendhoo, Milaidhoo, Miriandhoo, Muddhoo, Mudhdhoo, Muthaafushi, Nibiligaa, Olhugiri, Thiladhoo, Ufuligiri, Undoodhoo, Vakkaru, Velivarufinolhu, Veyofushee, Vinaneih-faruhuraa, Voavah
- Resort islands(*), airports(¤) and industrial islands are also considered uninhabited.

Baa Atoll (includes Southern Maalhosmadulu Atoll or Maalhosmadulu Dhekunuburi, Fasdhūtherē Atoll, and Goifulhafehendhu Atoll) is an administrative division of the Maldives. It consists of three separate natural atolls, namely southern Maalhosmadulu Atoll (which is 42 km long and 32 km wide and consists of 9 inhabited islands), the Fasdūtherē Atoll (wedged in between the two Maalhosmadulu Atolls and separated from north Maalhosmasdulu Atoll by Hani Kandu or Moresby Channel) and the smaller natural atoll known as Goifulhafehendhu Atoll (Horsburgh Atoll in the Admiralty charts).

Situated on the west of the Maldives atoll chain, it consists of 75 islands of which 13 are inhabited with a population of over 11,000 people. The remaining 57 islands are uninhabited, in addition to eight islands being developed as resorts.

Thulhaadhoo Island is traditionally well known for lacquerwork handicrafts.

== Geography ==
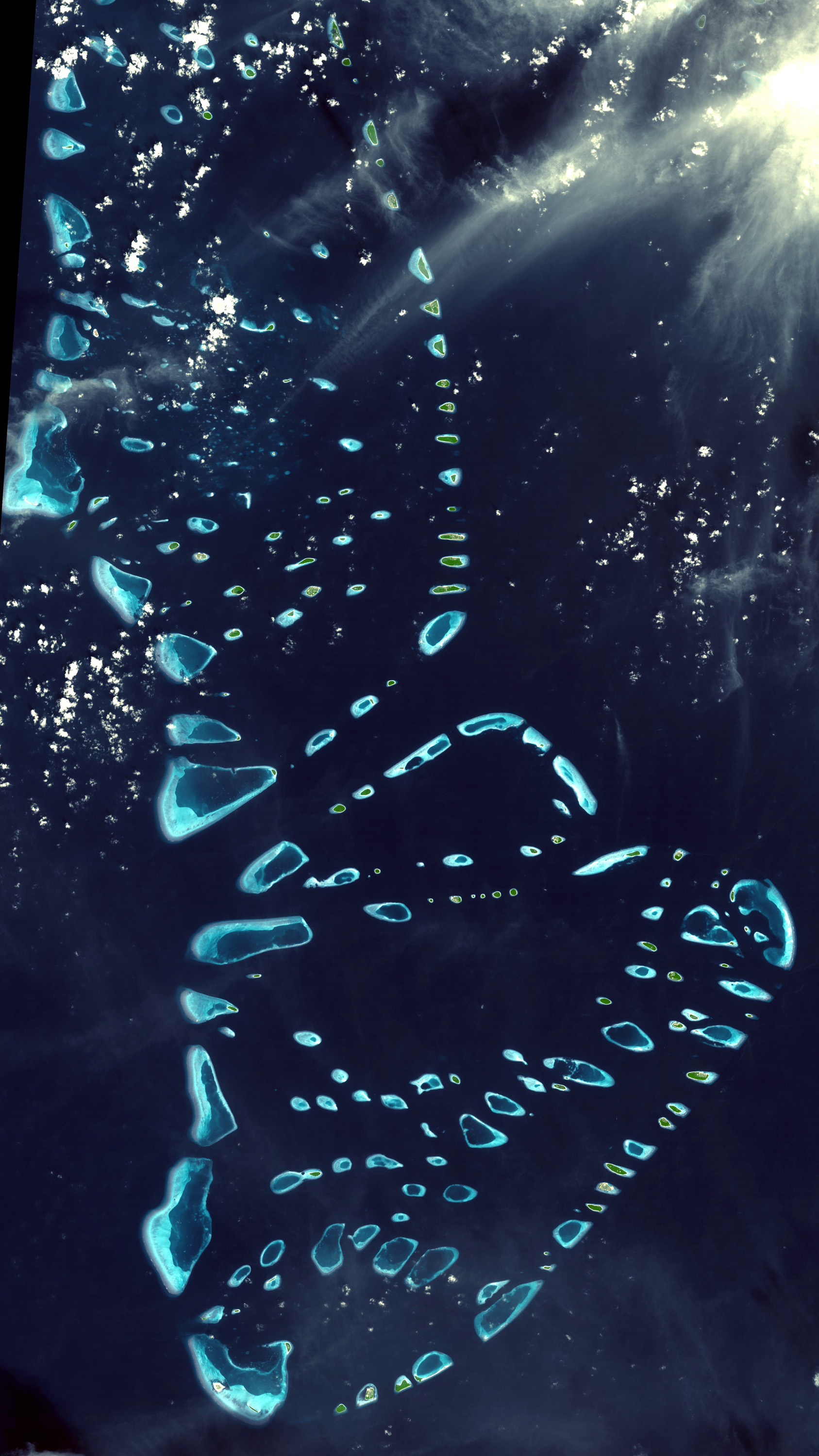
The Maalhosmadulu Atolls seen from space. The Southern Maalhosmadulu Atoll and Fasdūtherē Atoll (centre) make up Baa Atoll

Baa Atoll consists in two roughly circular sub-atolls, separated by the narrow Kudarikilu Kandu channel. The total measures approximately 38 km wide (east-west) for 46 km long (north-south), covering a surface of 1 127 km^{2} surface.

The atoll is formed by 105 coral reefs, representing a reef surface of 263 km^{2}. This reef surface is 61 islands provided with vegetation, and a variable number of sandy bays (between 4 and 14). Half (38) of these islands are less than 10 hectares, constituting less than 20% of the atoll lands.

The biggest island is Dharavandhoo (45,5 ha), followed by Kunfunadhoo (35 ha). The highest point, although difficult to establish, is situated in Funadhoo., with 3,19 m over the sea level.

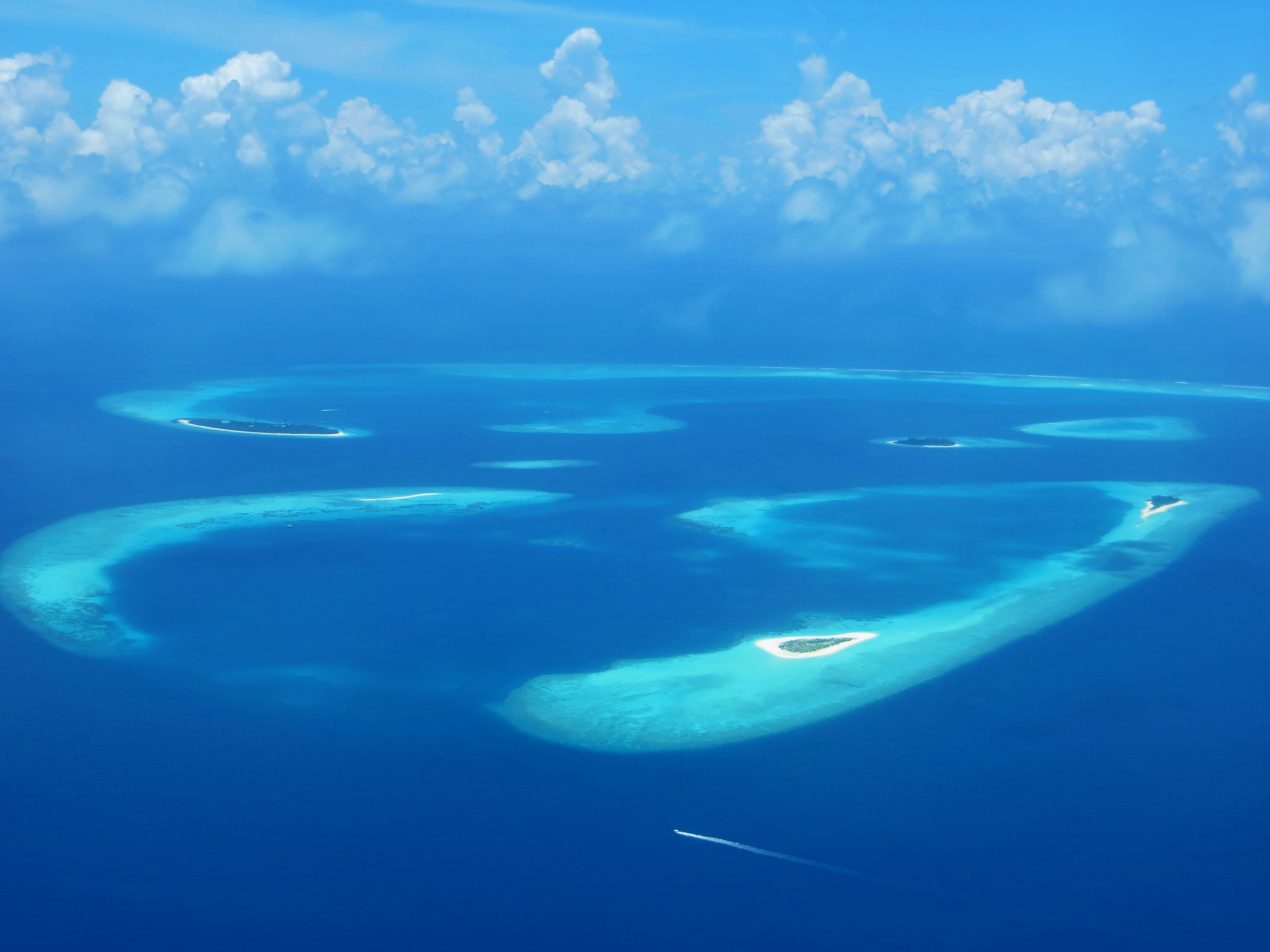
Sky view of a part of Baa atoll.

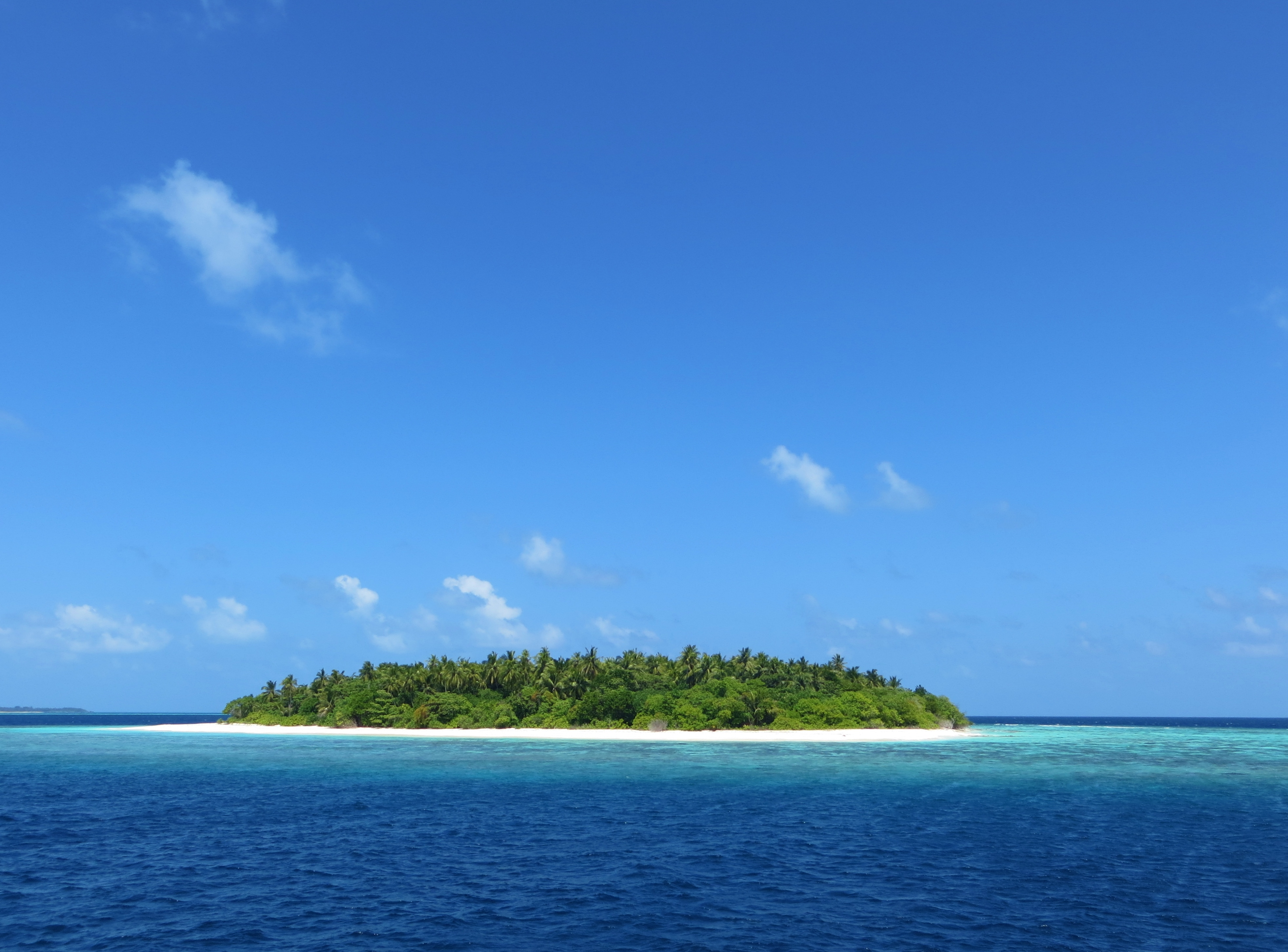
A typical desert island of Baa atoll, with its reef on the first ground.

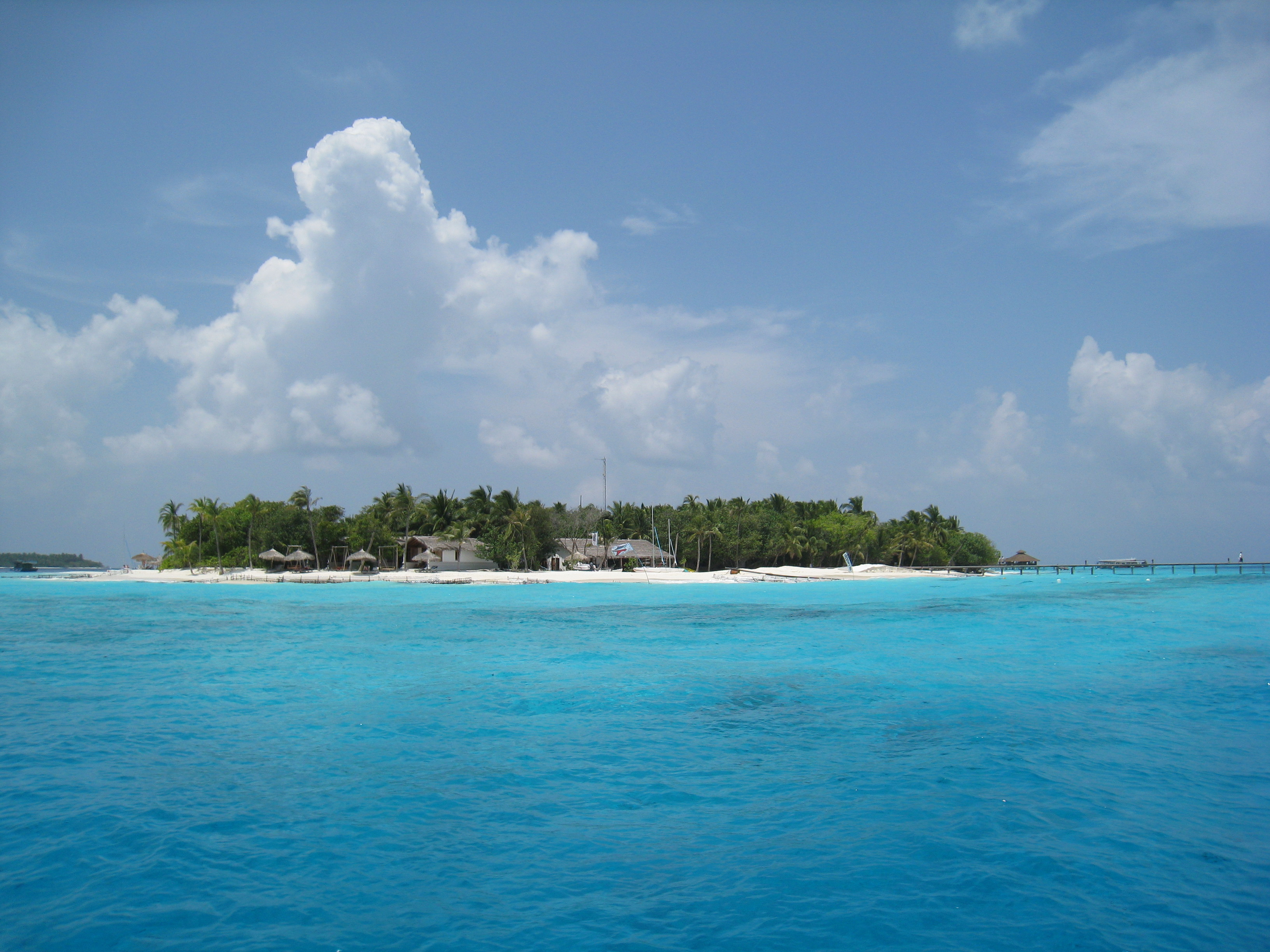
Sight of Fonimagoodhoo, a resort island.

== Biodiversity and ecology ==
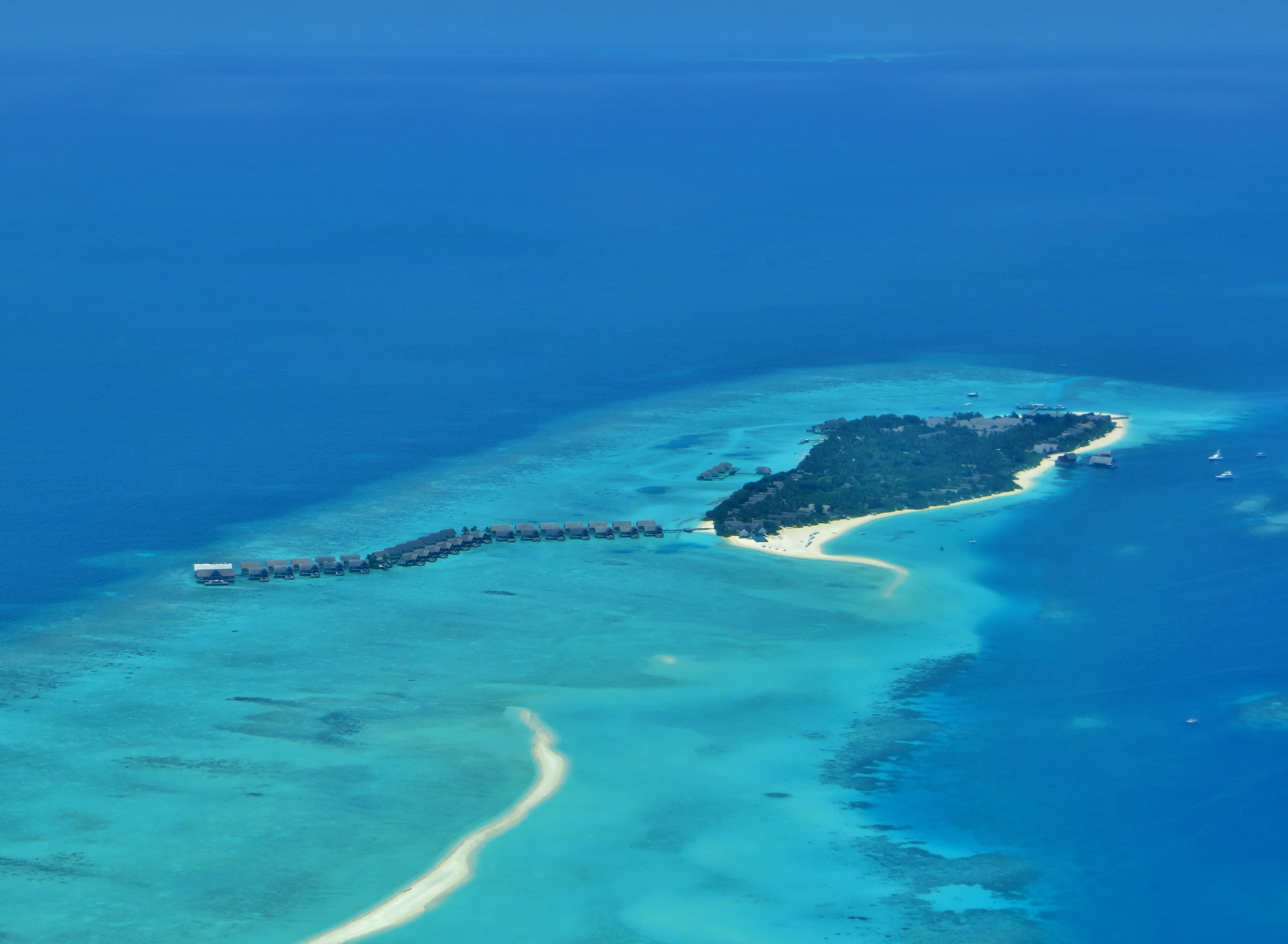
The resort island of Landaa Giraavaru.

Maalhosmadulu Atoll is also considered as a good example of the rich biodiversity found in the Maldives, including large mangroves and a unique diversity of fauna, such as the benthic fauna. Furthermore, the ring-shaped reef forms known as faru in the Dhivehi language is a reef structure which is unique to the Maldives.

The southernmost uninhabited island of Olhugiri in the North Maalhosmadulu Atoll lies 13 km north of Goifulhafehendhu Atoll. Olhugiri is well known for its unique natural vegetation and for providing two of the only perching sites for the great frigatebird in the Maldives. Likewise, other marine creatures such as sea turtles and hawksbill turtles can be encountered.

The Fisheries Ministry of the Maldives has banned catching turtles or taking eggs from Olhugiri, which also applies to 11 other islands.

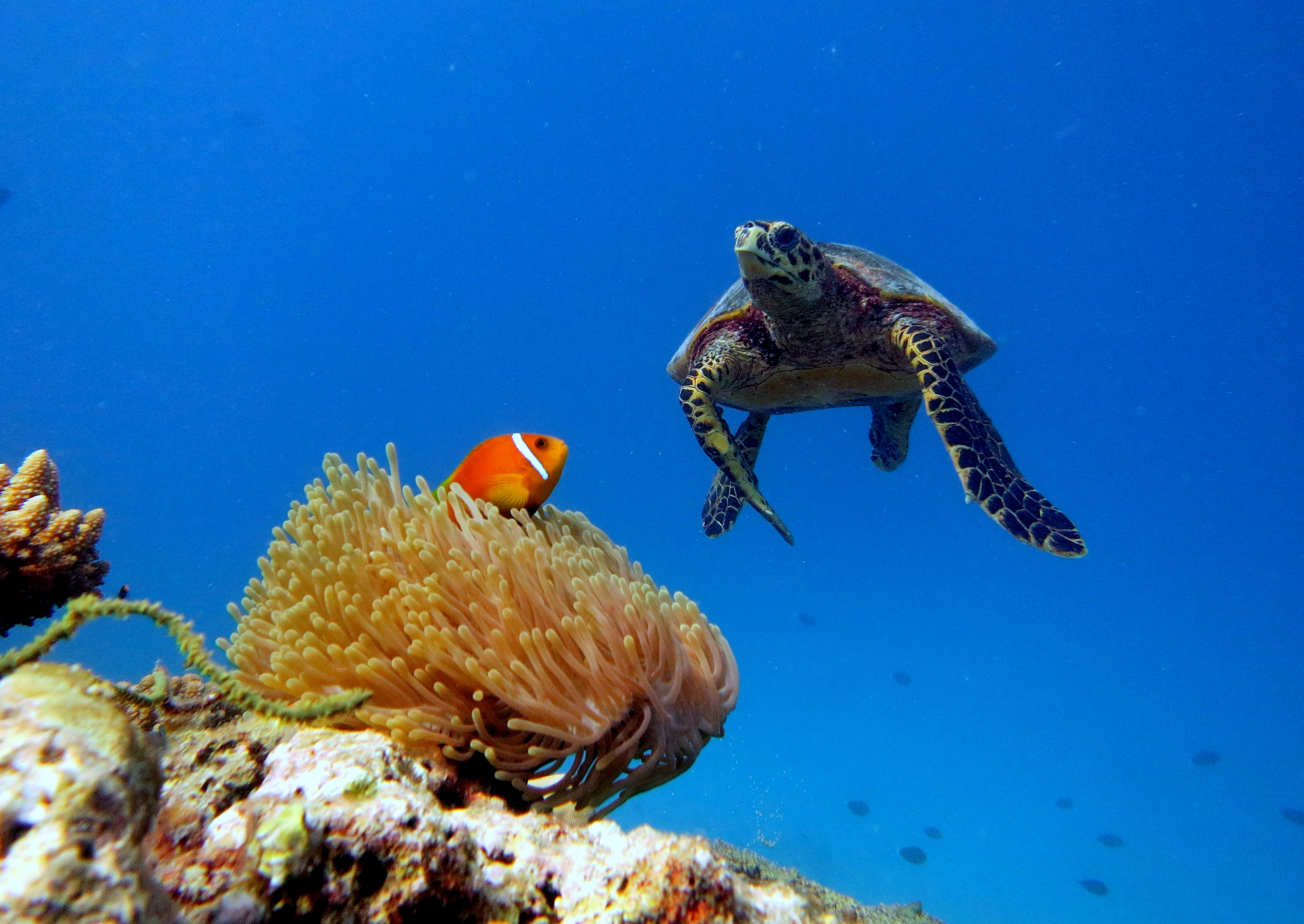
A typical underwater landscape of Baa atoll, with a hawksbill turtle and a Maldivian clownfish.

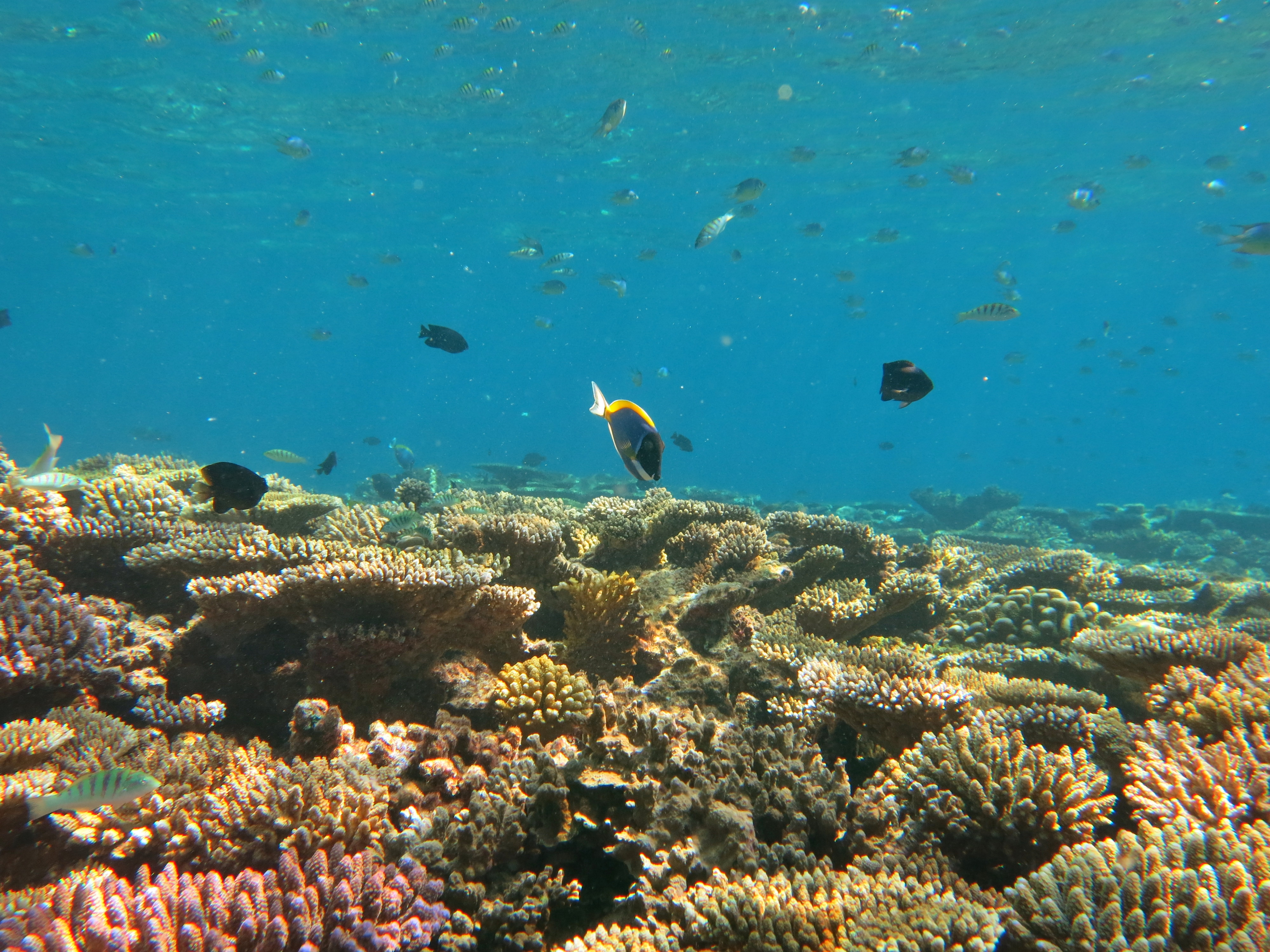
Coral landscape in Voavah.

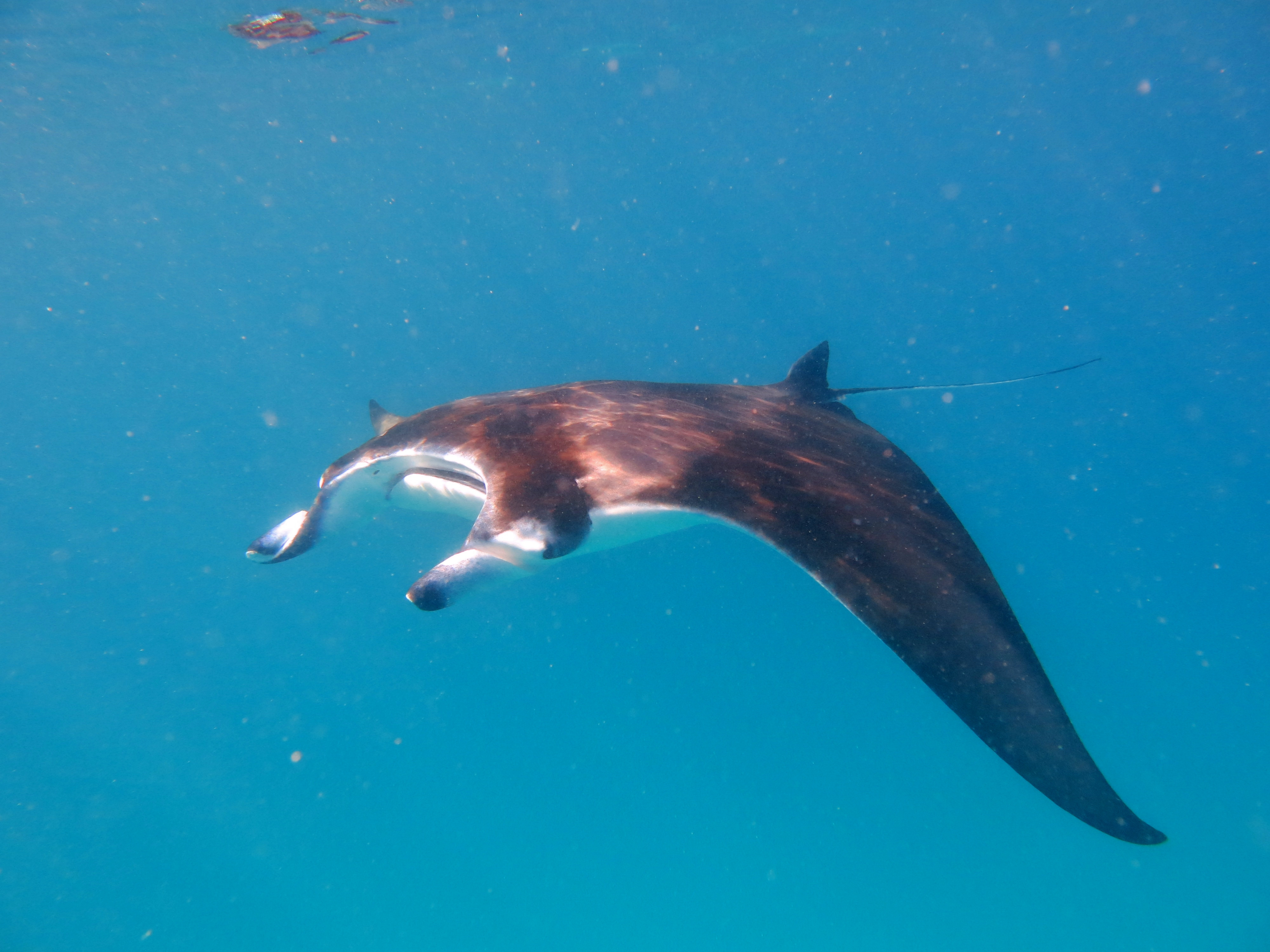
Baa atoll shelters an important population of manta rays (Manta alfredi)

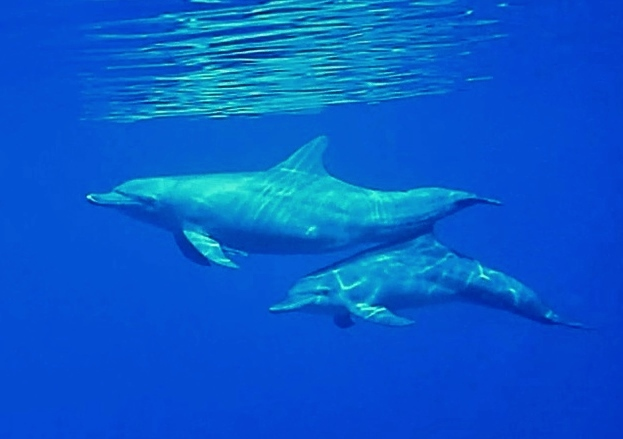
Bottlenose dolphins off Baa Atoll

== Biosphere reserve ==
The Maldives harbors globally-significant biodiversity in its numerous reefs and demonstrates a long history of human interaction with the environment. Covering approximately 139,700 ha of coastal/marine areas, the site is representative of the Maldives’ high diversity of reef animals, with hard and soft corals, reef-associated fish species, marine turtles, Manta Rays and Whale Sharks. In addition to its 12,170 inhabitants, some 350,000 tourists visit the biosphere reserve annually. As part of a Global Environment Facility (GEF) project, the site has great potential for demonstrating sustainable development throughout the Maldives and the region, while relying on a green economy.

Hanifaru Bay which is known locally as Vandhumaafaru Adi is thought to be one of the few places in the world where whale sharks congregate to mate, although recent research suggests otherwise with the vast majority of the whale sharks seen there being young males. The bay however regularly sees some of the largest gatherings of manta rays worldwide with up to one hundred individuals in the small inlet when the tide pushes plankton into the bay.

The designation of Baa Atoll as a UNESCO World Biosphere Reserve in June 2011 was a significant achievement for the Maldives. placing it in the company of world famous sites such as Komodo island in Indonesia, Uluru (Ayers Rock) in Australia, and the Galápagos Islands.

== Tourism ==
Baa Atoll is among the Maldives’ leading centres for tourism, noted for its combination of sustainable environmental management and high-end hospitality within the UNESCO Biosphere Reserve. The atoll hosts several internationally recognised resort islands that attract visitors seeking both luxury and ecological experiences.

== Voavah ==
Voavah (also known as Hafnas) is the first island designated by UNESCO as an exclusive use island. Voavah is owned by the Four seasons company and is available for hire.

== See also ==
- Reethi Beach
- Landaa Giraavaru
