= Rasdhoo =

Rasdhoo ރަސްދޫ
- Inhabited island
- Location in Maldives
- Coordinates: 4°15′46″N 72°59′29″E
- Country: Maldives
- Geographic atoll: Rasdhukuramathi Atoll
- Administrative atoll: Alif Alif Atoll
- Distance to Malé: 58.26 km (36.20 mi)

Dimensions
  - Length: 0.575 km (0.357 mi)
  - Width: 0.400 km (0.249 mi)

Population (2022)
  - Total: 1,282
- Time zone: UTC+05:00 (MST)

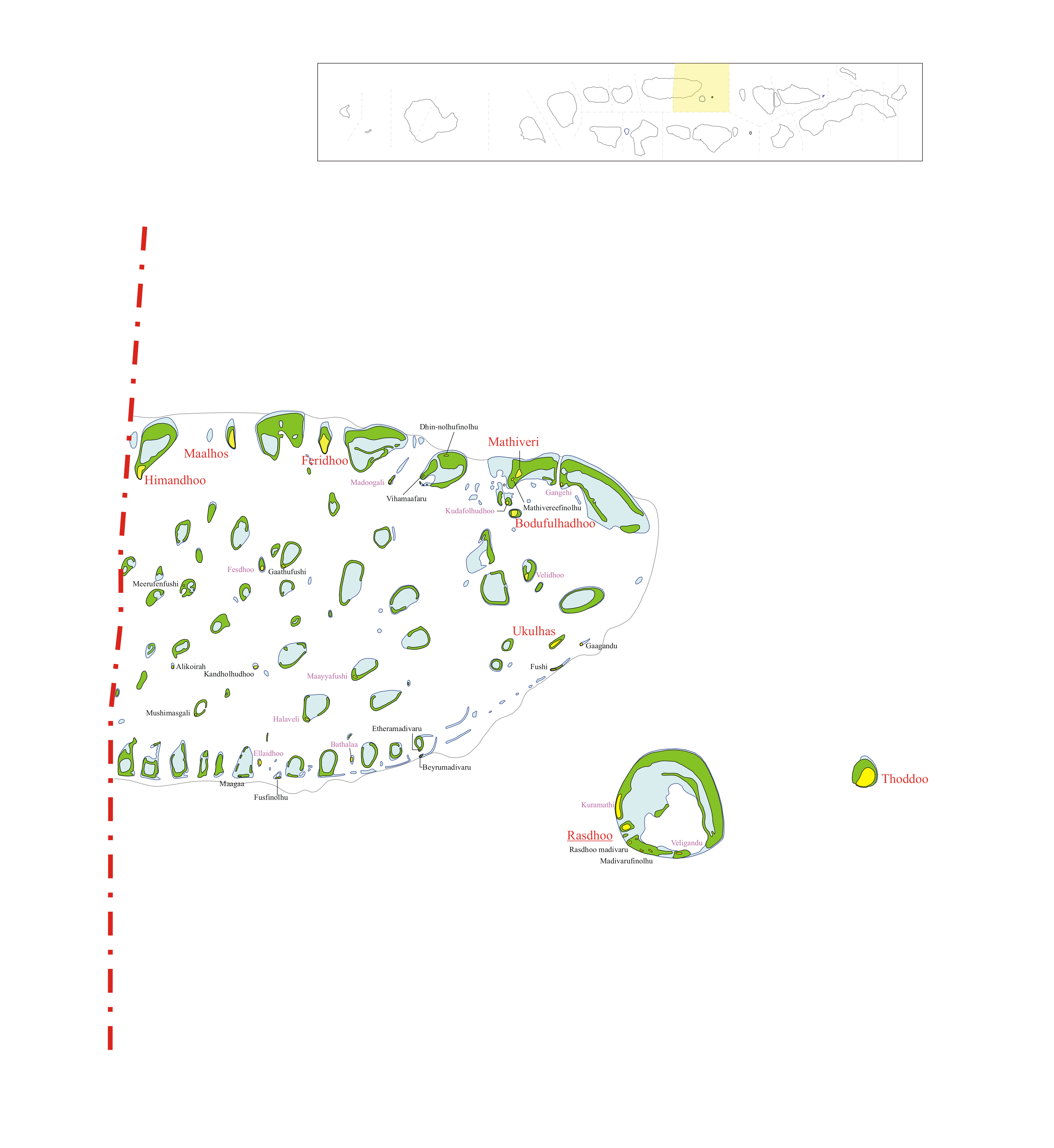
Alif Alif Atoll

Rasdhoo (Dhivehi: ރަސްދޫ) is an inhabited island of the Maldives. It is also the capital of the Alif Alif Atoll administrative division.

== Geography ==
The island is 58.26 km (36 mi; 31 nmi) west of the country's capital, Malé. It is the only inhabited island of a small natural atoll known as Rasdhoo, Rasdu or Ross Atoll located a few miles off NE Ari Atoll.

== Demography ==
Historical population
Year	Pop.	±%
2006	900	—
2014	949	+5.4%
2022	1,282	+35.1%
2006-2022: Census populations Source:

== Economy ==
As of September 2016, Rasdhoo has sixteen guesthouses.

== Transport ==
A thrice-a-week ferry service or daily speedboats operate between Malé and Rasdhoo.

== See also ==
- Bodufulhadhoo
- Feridhoo
- Himandhoo
- Maalhos
- Mathiveri
- Ukulhas
