= Mukhthar Naseer =

Maldivian footballer

Mukhtar Naseer
Personal information
- Full name: Mukhthar Naseer
- Date of birth: May 7, 1979 (age 47)
- Place of birth: Thoddoo, Maldives
- Height: 1.65 m (5 ft 5 in)
- Position: Midfielder

Team information
- Current team: New Radiant SC
- Number: 16

Youth career
- Rasdhoo

Senior career*
Years	Team	Apps	(Gls)
2003	Rasdhoo JU	?	(?)
2003	New Radiant SC		
2004–2008	Club Valencia		
2009–2011	Victory		
2012	Club Eagles	3	(0)
2013	Club Valencia		
2013	Maziya		
2014–	New Radiant SC		

International career
2007–2014	Maldives	17	(2)
- * Club domestic league appearances and goals

Mukhthar Naseer is a Maldivian international footballer, who currently plays for New Radiant SC in the Maldives.

Mukhtar is from Thoddoo, Alif Alif Atoll.

== Career ==
He was first noticed while playing for Rasdhoo football team in zone football tournament by Laszlo Kiss and he brought Two Kilo to Valencia. He is best known for his dribbling skills and speed.

=== International ===
He scored the winning goal for the Maldives against India in the final of the 2008 SAFF Championship. In 2014 Naseer retired from international football.

== Honours ==
Maldives

- SAFF Championship: 2008
