= Gamini (web series) =

Maldivian web series

- Genre: Period drama
- Written by: Moomin Fuad
- Directed by: Moomin Fuad
- Music by: Fathuhullah Abdul Fathah; Ibrahim Affan
- Country of origin: Maldives
- Original language: Divehi
- No. of seasons: 1
- No. of episodes: 13

Production
- Producer: Mohamed Zuhuree
- Cinematography: Husseyn Adnan
- Editor: Ahmed Asim
- Production company: Final Chapter Studio

Original release
- Release: 25 September – 11 December 2020

Gamini is a Maldivian period drama web television series developed for Baiskoafu by Moomin Fuad. Produced by Mohamed Zuhuree under Final Chapter Studio, the series stars Ismail Rasheed, Ahmed Asim, Ahmed Saeed, Mariyam Shakeela and Ismail Zahir in pivotal roles. Shooting for the series took place in Th. Kinbidhoo, Th. Veymandoo, Aa. Madoogali, Aa. Mathiveri, Aa. Feridhoo and F. Nilandhoo.

== Cast and characters ==
- Yoosuf Rafeeu as Mohammaidhee
- Ismail Rasheed as MP Ali Thoha
- Mariyam Shakeela as Sobeeha
- Ahmed Asim as Mohamed Siraj
- Ali Fizam as Mausoom
- Washiya Mohamed
- Susan Ibrahim Fulhu as Dhaleykaiydhee
- Aminath Nisha Rasheed as Sana
- Nathasha Jaleel as Habeeba
- Mariyam Shifa as Lubna's friend
- Mohamed Imran
- Ameen Shafeeu
- Ismail Zahir as Hassan Iqbal
- Ajunaz Ali
- Ismail Waheed as Bob
- Juza Jaufar
- Ahmed Saeed as Ageel
- Abdulla Naseer as Saleem

== Episodes ==
No. in season	Title	Directed by	Original release date
1	"Episode 01"	Moomin Fuad	25 September 2020
Mohamed Siraj (Ahmed Asim), a wealthy man relocates to an island hoping for setting up an agriculture business at the site. There, he is verbally introduced to their parliamentary member, MP Ali Thoha (Ismail Rasheed), whom the constituents adore. Thoha's only daughter, Lubna Thoha, visits the island along with three friends.
2	"Episode 02"	Moomin Fuad	25 September 2020
Siraj starts following Luba to the point she suspects his father is being targeted by someone. The friends go to a nearby uninhabited island for picnic, where Lubna is stabbed and murdered by Siraj.
3	"Episode 03"	Moomin Fuad	2 October 2020
Siraj hides the body of Lubna and swims across to the island. Investigation for the murder commences where police suspends the movement of any vessels to/from the island, sabotaging his escape plans. The police suspects Siraj and attempts to arrest him. He flees from the house on the sound of siren and seeks shelter in the forest. The next morning, a gang of thugs catches him in the forest and is held captive in another island.
4	"Episode 04"	Moomin Fuad	9 October 2020
Police search for Siraj continues, while he is being tortured by the gang and business partners of Thoha. An interrogation with Siraj takes an unexpected turn when Siraj convinces the gang leader, Bob, to outpower Thoha.
5	"Episode 05"	Moomin Fuad	16 October 2020
Siraj drags Thoha into the murder conspiracy, accusing him as the mastermind behind the assault for "sympathy votes". As Siraj is set free, a flashback events of 32 years is shown.
6	"Episode 06"	Moomin Fuad	23 October 2020
7	"Episode 07"	Moomin Fuad	30 October 2020
8	"Episode 08"	Moomin Fuad	6 November 2020
9	"Episode 09"	Moomin Fuad	13 November 2020
10	"Episode 10"	Moomin Fuad	20 November 2020
11	"Episode 11"	Moomin Fuad	27 November 2020
12	"Episode 12"	Moomin Fuad	4 December 2020
13	"Episode 13"	Moomin Fuad	11 December 2020

== Release and reception ==
The project was announced in January 2020 by releasing a teaser trailer which was positively received by the critics for its effective transition in timeline from 1980s to present. The first two episodes from the thirteen episodes series was streamed on 25 September 2020.

Upon release, the series received widespread positive reviews from critics. Gufthag Ajeez from Times called the series an "international Netflix standard" project where "each department from production, direction, cinematography, editing, back music to acting has outdone each and every prior releases in the industry". Azhan Ibrahim reviewing from Hama praised the direction and screenplay for mingling three decades in a sequential manner and called the film "a revolutionary series to the industry". Ifraz Ali from Dho? ranked the series in the second position from the list of year's best projects while particularly praising the cinematography for capturing the three decades in its most "authentic" way. "Apart from some dialogues and the length of each episode, the series does not falter in any department".
