= Alikoirah =

Alikoirah as a place name may refer to:

- Alikoirah (Alif Alif Atoll) (Republic of Maldives)
- Alikoirah (Alif Dhaal Atoll) (Republic of Maldives)
