= Bathalaa =

Bathalaa as a place name may refer to:

- Bathalaa (Alif Alif Atoll) (Republic of Maldives)
- Bathalaa (Baa Atoll) (Republic of Maldives)
