= Maayyafushi =

Maayyafushi or Maayafushi or Mayyafushi may refer to the following places in the Maldives:

- Maayyafushi, Alif Alif Atoll
- Maayyafushi, Lhaviyani Atoll
