= Veligandu =

Veligandu may refer to the following places in the Maldives:

- Veligandu (Alif Alif Atoll)
- Veligandu (Haa Dhaalu Atoll)
