= Washiya Mohamed =

Maldivian actress (born 1999)

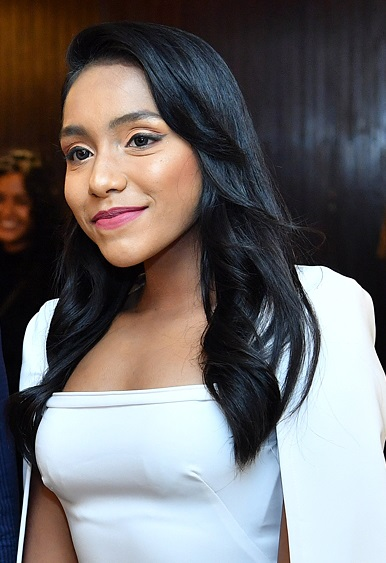
- Mohamed in 2019
- Born: 18 June 1999 (age 27); Male', Maldives
- Occupation: Actress
- Years active: 2019–present

Washiya Mohamed (born 18 June 1999) is a Maldivian film actress. She made her career debut by playing one of the main roles in the sitcom web series, Thin Bibee (2019). She gained notice with the web series Ehenas and continued starring in several other notable performances including the role of a domestically abused girlfriend in Huvaa Kohfa Bunan (2020), rape victim in Mazloom (2021), a politician's daughter in Dharaka (2022) and a vengeful mother in Mirai (2023).

She received international recognition with the film Hehes (2022), where her role as an obsessed girlfriend fetched her the Best Supporting Actress Award at the Karnataka International Film Festival. She achieved further success with starring roles in Kalhaki (2023) and Free Delivery (2023).

== Early life ==
After completing nursey education at Maafannu Madharusa, Mohamed joined Ghiyasuddin International School, where she actively participated in several stage dramas, accelerating her interest in working in the film industry. While studying in grade 6, she performed the role of a male sorcerer in one of such stage shows, which she credited as an "eye-opening performance" for her with regard to "method acting". She continued to showcase her acting skills in various theatrical stage shows while pursuing high school education at MAPS International High.

== Career ==
=== 2019–22: Career beginnings and Hehes ===
Mohamed made her career debut by playing one of the main roles in Mohamed Munthasir's sitcom web series, Thin Bibee (2019). Initially hesitant due to a perceived "lack of confidence" in working on-screen, she rejected the role when first offered by her friend Nathasha Jaleel, a co-star in the series. However, when Mohamed was re-offered the role by Munthasir during an advertisement shoot, she decided to "give it a try" for a fresh start. The series was released on the newly launched digital streaming platform Baiskoafu, and while the feedback was minimal, it marked the beginning of her screen presence. Her journey continued as she hosted VTV's "The Baiskoafu Show," directed by Naaisha Nashid. This opportunity led her to Ahmed Iqbal's Ehenas, where her impressive skills prompted Iqbal to create a new character, Pink, not present in his original novel.

He offered her the role in the Ravee Farooq-directed web series Ehenas, an experience that showcased her acting abilities. In this series, Mohamed portrayed an independent woman and a supportive friend, earning positive reviews from critics. The storyline delved into the challenges faced by a long-term domestic and sexually abused male victim in navigating societal obstacles related to marriage. In addition to a brief appearance in Moomin Fuad's period drama web television series Gamini, she contributed to the ensemble cast of Yoosuf Shafeeu's romantic comedy web series Huvaa Kohfa Bunan. In this series, she portrayed the role of the sister of a politician and a domestically abused girlfriend. She then starred in Moomin Fuad's crime drama short film Feehaali, where her rebellious character and the film got positive reviews from critics.

The subsequent year, she collaborated with Ilyas Waheed for the first chapter from his four-part anthology web series Mazloom, which delves into the lives of two survivors of alleged rape assaults. In a review by Ahmed Rasheed from MuniAvas, Mohamed's performance was praised, with Rasheed noting: "As usual, she puts her best foot forward and portrays the rape victim character very naturally". Mariyam Waheedha from Dhen praised her "mature" performance despite her relatively short career. Waheedha commended her portrayal of the character Zaushan, stating that she is a perfect choice by Ilyas Waheed. While acknowledging that she may need to refine her facial expressions, Waheedha expressed that she is already mature enough for such roles.

2022 was a successful year for Mohamed. She first starred as a modern interior designer surrounded by a group of men with whom she instantly connects but feels abandoned in her own home, in the segment titled "Bits & Pieces" from the anthology web series Noontha?, which was directed by Naaisha Nashid. Critics praised the series, as well as Mohamed's performance, for its depiction of modern love and for breaking away from the stereotyped melodrama that Maldivians are most familiar with.

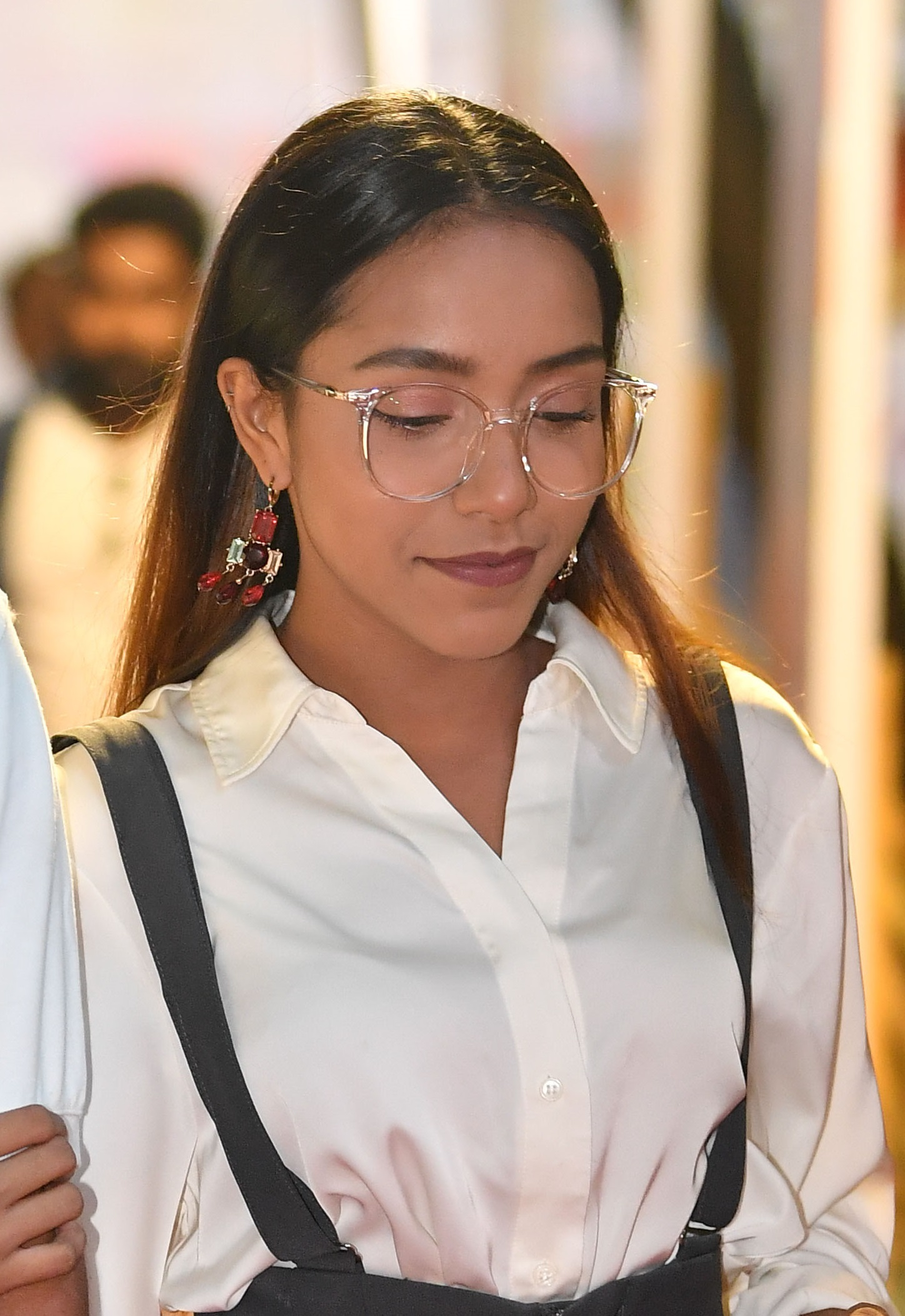
Mohamed attending Olympus reopening ceremony, 2023

This was followed by Azhan Ibrahim's crime thriller web series Dharaka, centering around a high-profile case involving the disappearance of a politician's daughter. The first episode of the series garnered widespread positive reviews from both critics and the audience, where the performance of actors, including Mohamed, was particularly lauded, along with the "suspense and well-crafted" direction from Azhan Ibrahim. She later collaborated with Moomin Fuad for his romantic crime web series Netheemeywhich explores the story of an irresponsible, spoiled kid who moves away from his family with his wife, only to reunite with his ex-lover living in the opposite apartment. During the same year, she played the role of a greedy and possessive ex-girlfriend in Ahmed Nimal's suspense thriller film Hehes (2022). At 3rd Karnataka International Film Festival, she was received the Best Supporting Actress award in the feature film category.

=== 2023–present: Further releases ===
Her first collaboration in 2023 was with Azhan Ibrahim for his crime thriller web series Mirai which revolves around a happy family that is torn apart by the untimely death of their only child, and their journey for justice. The series, along with her performance as Mira, a young mother who is willing to go any extent to avenge the murderer of her son, gets overwhelming response from the critics. She was also credited as a co-producer of the film. She next starred alongside Aisha Ali in Naaisha Nashid-directed anthology web series Badhalu in the first segment titled "Friends". This segment explores the bond between two friends, Reema and Zai, who heavily rely on each other but are left heartbroken when the shocking affair of the best friend is revealed.

The same year, Yoosuf Shafeeu released his horror film Kalhaki in which, Mohamed played the role of Ziyana, one of the friends who embark on a holiday getaway, only to find their trip turning into a horrifying nightmare as bizarre events unfold. The film received mixed to positive reviews from critics. Aminath Luba reviewing from The Press lauded her performance in portraying the possessed character, commending her ability to stand on par with the senior actors. This was followed by Ilyas Waheed's dark comedy film Free Delivery (2023) which revolves around three colleagues working in a restaurant who get trapped in a murder case while on a food delivery. The film received mainly positive reviews from critics. Luba favored Washiya's performance and noted that she played an unusual character and pulled it off within her ability, providing depth to the role.

== Filmography ==
Key
| † | Denotes films that have not yet been released |

=== Feature film ===
| Year | Title | Role | Notes | Ref(s) |
|---|---|---|---|---|
| 2022 | Hehes | Ina | Karnataka IFF Best Supporting Actress in a Feature Film | |
| 2023 | Loabi Vevijje | Herself | Special appearance | |
| 2023 | Kalhaki | Ziyana | | |
| 2023 | Free Delivery | Julie/Jallaa | | |
| 2024 | Kanbalhi | Aalin | | |
| 2024 | Lasviyas | Yusra | | |
| 2025 | Abadhah | Haifa | | |
| 2025 | Sorry | Hana | | |
| 2025 | Kan'bulo | Maree | | |
| 2026 | Dhoadhi | | Special Appearance | |
| 2026 | Majunoon | Milly | | |
| 2026 | Keevve? † | Saleema | | |

=== Television ===
| Year | Title | Role | Notes | Ref(s) |
|---|---|---|---|---|
| 2019–2020 | Thin Bibee | Herself | Main role | |
| 2019 | Furabandhu | | Main role; 5 episodes | |
| 2020 | Ehenas | Pink | Main role; 12 episodes | |
| 2020 | Gamini | Unnamed | Guest role | |
| 2020–2021 | Huvaa Kohfa Bunan | Zara | Main role | |
| 2021 | Mazloom | Fathimath Zaushan | Main role in "Chapter 1: Mazloom" | |
| 2022 | Noontha? | Zeeshan | Main role in the segment "Bits & Pieces" | |
| 2022 | Dharaka | Nisha Sameer | Main role; 8 episodes | |
| 2022 | Netheemey | Sausan | Main role; 5 episodes | |
| 2023 | Mirai | Mira | Main role; 13 episodes | |
| 2023 | Badhalu | Reema | Main role; Episode: "Friends" | |
| 2024 | Yaaraa | Zara | Guest role; "Episode 28" | |
| 2025 | Varah Loabivey | Shaana Abdul Razzaq | Main role; 5 episodes | |
| 2025 | Chaalaakee | | | |
| 2026 | Barudhaasthu | Rau | Main role | |
| 2026 | Beynun | Maya | Main role | |
| 2026 | JunJulaa | Zara Kareem | Main role; 10 episodes | |

=== Short film ===
| Year | Title | Role | Notes | Ref(s) |
|---|---|---|---|---|
| 2020 | Feehaali | Nanna | | |
| 2021 | O' Wazan | Mother | | |

=== Other work ===
| Year | Title | Director | Producer | Notes |
|---|---|---|---|---|
| 2023 | Mirai | | Yes | Web series; 13 episodes |

== Accolades ==
| Year | Award | Category | Nominated work | Result | Ref(s) |
|---|---|---|---|---|---|
| 2023 | 3rd Karnataka International Film Festival | Best Supporting Actress – Feature Films | Hehes | Won | |
| 2025 | 1st MSPA Film Awards | Best Supporting Actor – Female | Hehes | Won | |
