= Ross Atoll =

Rasdhoo (Ross)
- Inhabited island
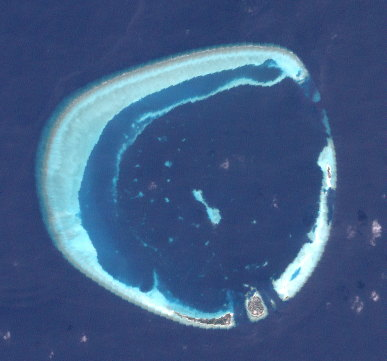
- Ross Atoll

- Location in Maldives
- Coordinates: 04°17′25″N 72°58′44″E
- Country: Maldives
- Administrative atoll: Alif Alif Atoll

Dimensions
  - Width: 6.4 km (4.0 mi)
- Time zone: UTC+05:00 (MST)

Ross Atoll is a small atoll in the Admiralty Chart with an almost round lagoon. It is located at about 8 km (5 mi) from the northeast point of Ari Atoll and is one of the natural atolls of the Maldives.

The northern and western sides form one continuous barrier reef, and the eastern side is another barrier reef. The four mile wide lagoon has soundings from 15 to 20 fathoms (27 to 37 m) and abounds in detached coral patches.

This natural atoll was named Ross Atoll by Captain Robert Moresby during his survey of the Maldive Islands. It was named after Captain Daniel Ross of the Bombay Navy, one of the first surveyors of the area. Captain Ross later became the East India Company's Marine Surveyor General in Calcutta.

The main island is Rasdhoo. Kuramathi Tourist Resort is also located in this small atoll.
