= Kuramathi =

- holiday island resort
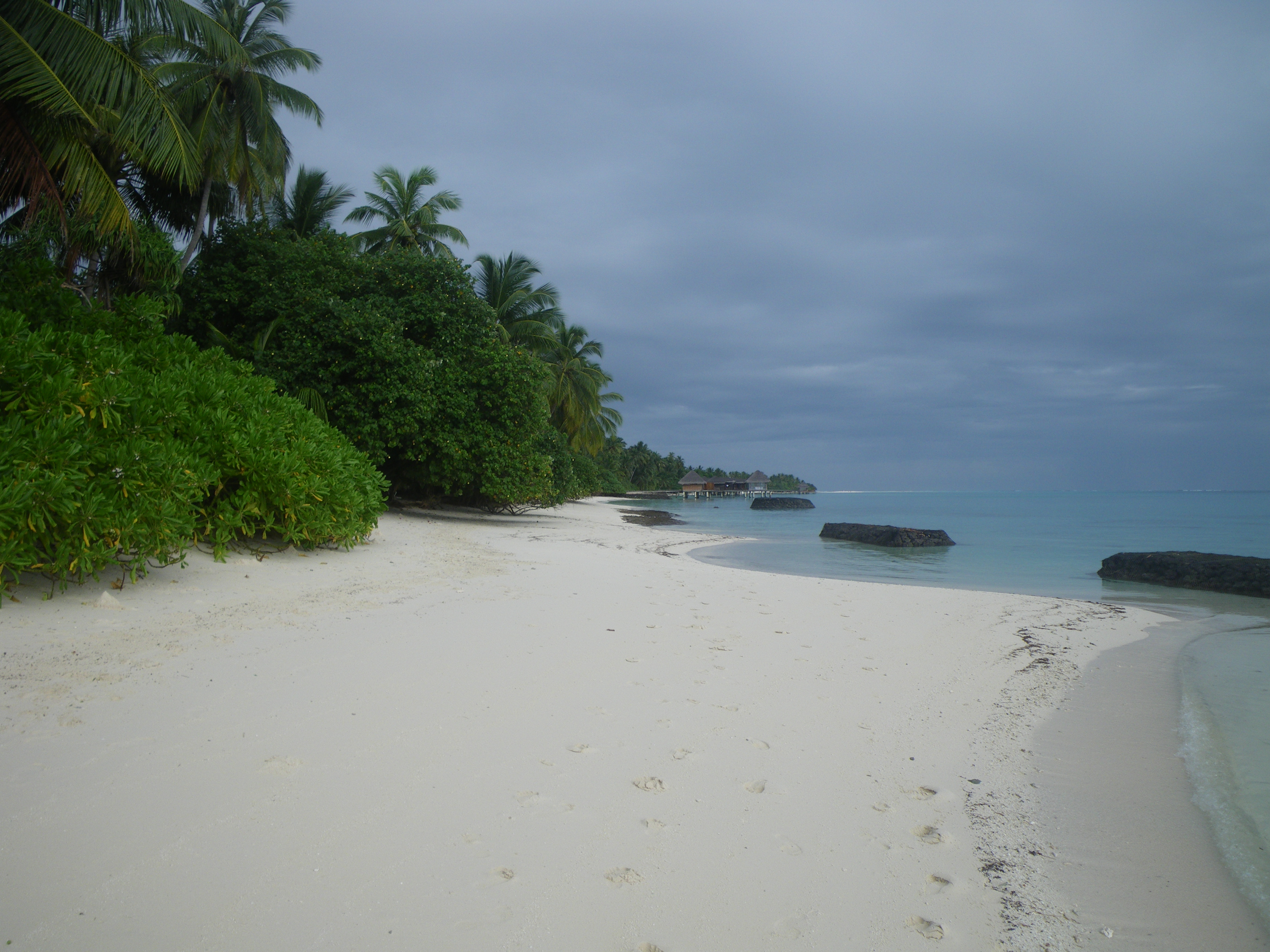
- Beach of Kuramathi (Lagoon)

- Location in Maldives
- Coordinates: 04°15′31″N 72°58′48″E
- Country: Maldives
- Administrative atoll: Alif Alif Atoll
- Distance to Malé: 56 km (35 mi)

Dimensions
  - Length: 0.975 km (0.606 mi)
  - Width: 0.650 km (0.404 mi)

Population
  - Total: 839
- Time zone: UTC+05:00 (MST)

Kuramathi at 2 km (1 mi) long is the largest of six islands that belong to the small natural atoll of Rasdhūkuramathi which administratively belongs to Alif Alif Atoll.

== Geography ==
Geographically, the island is located approximately 56 km (35 mi) south west of the capital island Malé and can be reached by a 20-minute sea plane flight or a 90-minute boat transfer. There is a sandbank on the west of the island which is only visible when the tide is low.

== Ecology ==
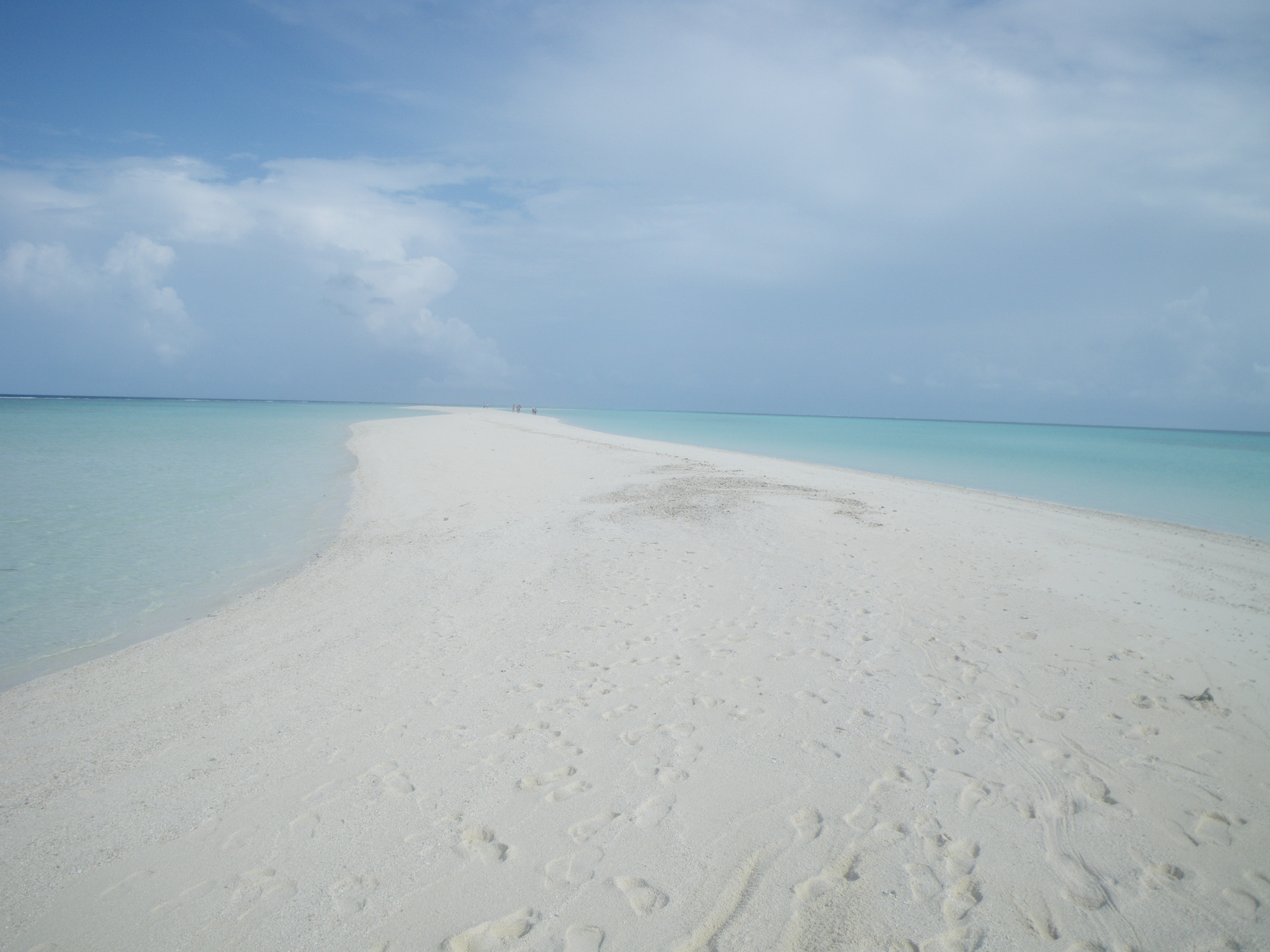
Sandbank of Kuramathi

Since January 2000, Kuramathi has had a biological station where guests can obtain information about the local marine environment.

The following marine life can be encountered in Kuramathi: angelfish; butterflyfish; corals; hawkfish; manta rays; Moorish idols; moray eels; parrotfish; Portuguese men o' war; rays; sea turtles; sharks; surgeonfish; sweetlips; triggerfish; unicornfish; Sunfish
