= Feehaali =

- Official film poster
- Directed by: Moomin Fuad
- Written by: Moomin Fuad
- Screenplay by: Moomin Fuad
- Produced by: Mohamed Zuhuree
- Starring: Mohamed Zuhuree; Washiya Mohamed; Anoof Ali Musthafa
- Cinematography: Hussain Adnan
- Edited by: Ahmed Asim
- Music by: Ibrahim Affan
- Production company: Final Chapter Studio
- Distributed by: Baiskoafu
- Release date: January 1, 2021
- Running time: 25 minutes
- Country: Maldives
- Language: Dhivehi

Feehaali is a 2021 Maldivian crime thriller short film written and directed by Moomin Fuad. Produced by Mohamed Zuhuree under Final Chapter Studio, the film stars Mohamed Zuhuree, Washiya Mohamed and Anoof Ali Musthafa in pivotal roles. The film was digitally released on 1 January 2021.

== Premise ==
Nanna (Washiya Mohamed), a young pretty girl begs her ex-boyfriend, Soppe (Anoof Ali Musthafa), to meet her in Male', one last time before her departure, hoping she could escape from her old-aged husband, Samad (Mohamed Zuhuree). While having a coffee, Soppe throws a cigarette filter off the terrace which lands on the newly purchased bed which Ahmed (Ali Fizam) was delivering to his short tempered brother-in-law, Masood (Ismail Rasheed). Having no cash in had, Ahmed leaves the bed with the pick-up driver (Ahmed Ishar) and flees from the scene. Ahmed gets rid of the bed by selling it to Samad for a cheap price. Due to the time-restriction in loading the bed into their boat, Samad takes it to his guest house. On entering his room, Samad is greeted with a surprise where he sees his young wife making out with her ex-boyfriend. Outraged, he suffocates him to death and buries him in the very same bed.

== Cast ==
- Mohamed Zuhuree as Samad
- Washiya Mohamed as Nanna
- Anoof Ali Musthafa as Soppe
- Ismail Rasheed as Masood
- Ali Fizam as Ahmed
- Ahmed Ishar as Driver
- Nathasha Jaleel as Azima
- Mariyam Shifa (special appearance)
- Susan Ibrahim Fulhu (special appearance)

== Release ==
Feehaali was digitally released on 1 January 2021 on the occasion of New Year. It was made available for streaming from Baiskoafu application on the same day.

=== Critical response ===
Upon release, the film received extremely positive reviews from critics. Ifraz Ali from Dho? praised the direction and writing by Moomin Fuad and wrote: "Similar to his previous ventures including Goh Raalhu and Nivairoalhi, the film ends with a difficult situation for the audience to evaluate and process what just happened; such is his power at his work". Echoing similar sentiments, Fathimath Sausan Ali from CNM called the film as one of the best local recent local productions with a "jaw breaking" climax. "In an half an hour, the film justifies the crime-nest of the capital city with its path-breaking direction, writing, cinematography and editing". Calling the film a "masterpiece" by Final Chapter Studio crew, Ahmed Rasheed from MuniAvas commended the performance and technical work of the whole crew and wrote: "Everyone involved in this project deserves full marks for forcing the audience to hold their breath from the very beginning till the credits roll out.
