= Thoddoo =

Thoddoo ތޮއްޑޫ
- Inhabited island
- Location in Maldives
- Coordinates: 4°26′13″N 72°57′34″E
- Country: Maldives
- Administrative atoll: Alif Alif Atoll
- Distance to Malé: 67.51 km (41.95 mi)

Dimensions
  - Length: 1.675 km (1.041 mi)
  - Width: 1.200 km (0.746 mi)

Population (2022)
  - Total: 1,924
- Time zone: UTC+05:00 (MST)

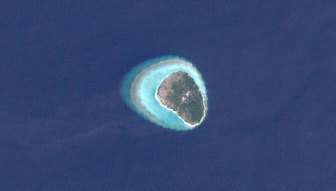
Thoddoo

Thoddoo (Dhivehi: ތޮއްޑޫ) is one of the inhabited islands of Alif Alif Atoll in the Republic of Maldives.

== History ==
=== Archaeology ===
There are Buddhist ruins in an area of this island.

== Geography ==
The island is 67.51 km (42 mi; 36 nmi) northwest of the country's capital, Malé, and also 20 km (12 mi) from Rasdhoo. Thoddoo is about 2 km (1.2 mi) in length and 1 km (0.62 mi) in width. 1/3rd of the total area is agricultural, another third is the village itself, and the rest of the island is empty.

== Demography ==
Historical population
| Year | Pop. | ±% |
|---|---|---|
| 2006 | 1,199 | — |
| 2014 | 1,348 | +12.4% |
| 2022 | 1,924 | +42.7% |
2006-2022: Census populations Source:

== Economy ==
Agriculture is one of the main income sources of the island. Local farmers cultivate various tropical vegetables like chillies, brinjal, bottle gourd, bitter gourd, drumstick, ladies finger, pumpkin and different types of fruits like papaya, honey melons, passion fruit, banana, water apple and mango. This island is the largest producer of watermelon in Maldives. Watermelons are commonly produced during the holy month of Ramadan when demand in Malé peaks and prices are high. Thoddoo is well known as the largest producer of betel leaf in the country and it is the strongest economic activity in Thoddoo in the past 40 years.

When the local tourism was introduced in the year 2015, Thoddoo also started playing a wide role in tourism industry and the tourism is now becoming a main economy of Thoddoo. Now, there are approximately over 200 guest rooms and 10 restaurants on the island. 15 speed boats for guest transfer are available and its total annual turn over comes approximately $5.4 million.
