= Nathasha Jaleel =

Maldivian actress (born 1984)

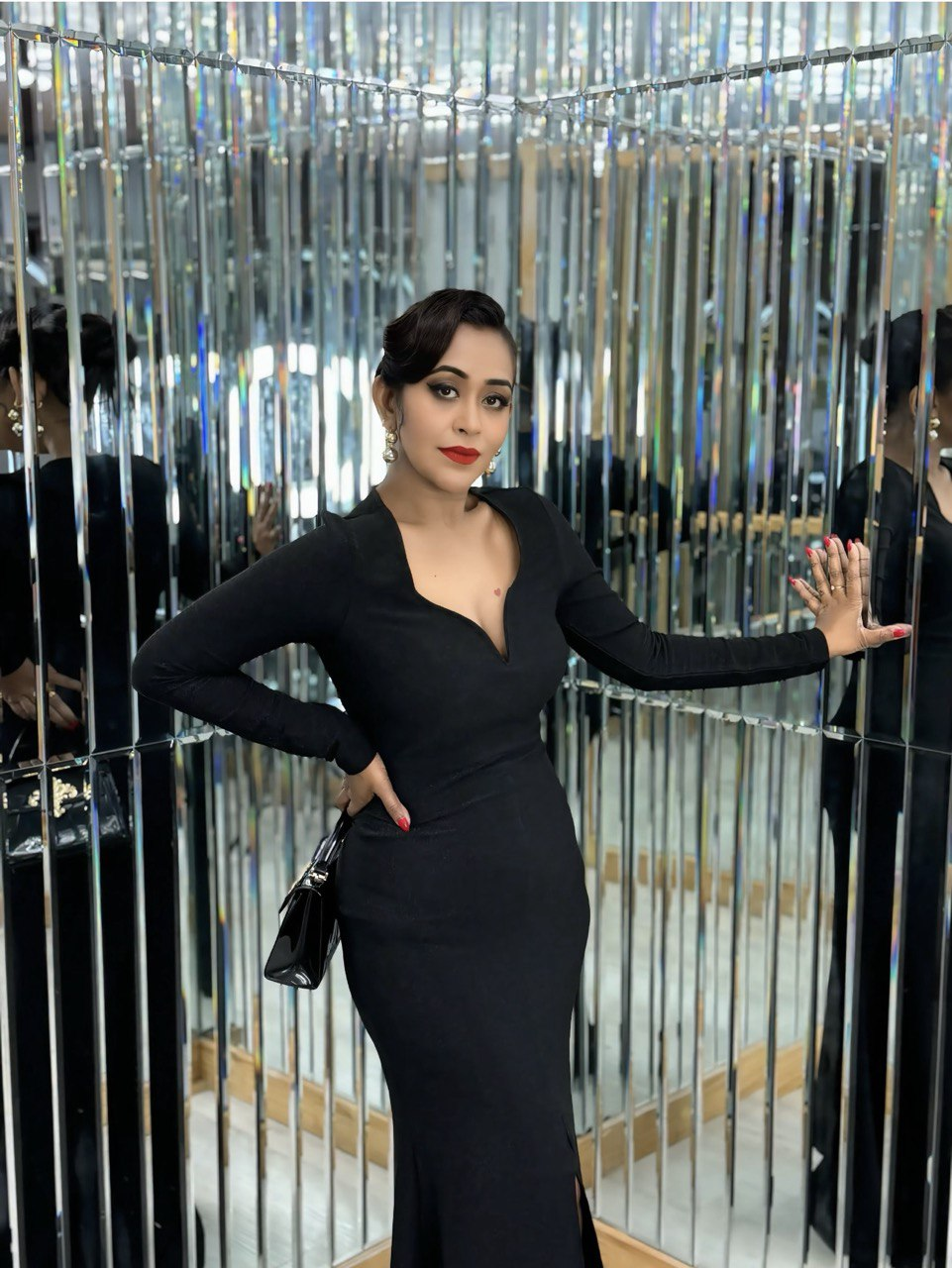
- Nathasha in 2024
- Born: 15 March 1984 (age 42); Male', Maldives
- Occupation: Actress
- Years active: 2019–present
- Children: 1

Nathasha Jaleel' (born 15 March 1984) is a Maldivian film actress.

== Career ==
Before pursuing a career in acting, Jaleel was an active TikTok user, which won her recognition as a performer. During this time, she was featured in several advertisements and took part in few acting workshops. At the end of such one workshop, actor Mohamed Munthasir offered her one of the main roles in his sitcom web series, Thin Bibee (2019).

However, it was her next role, Ravee Farooq-directed web series Ehenas which "promoted her acting ability". this series follows the experiences of a male victim of long-term domestic and sexual abuse, and the societal obstacles he faces when attempting marriage. Jaleel appeared in its second season as Farzana, an empowered single mother. Ifraz Ali from Dho? wrote: "In this season, Jaleel's fantastic performance is the only factor that poured petrol on a dying fire".

During the filming of Thin Bibee, Fuad offered her a side role in his period drama web television series Gamini. She accepted the role, hoping it would "pave the path" for her career. Her performance in the series as the wife of the island's chief was positively received by critics. One critic wrote in Dho?, "Jaleel has proved that a genuine performance and a strong screen presence can grab the limelight even with minimal dialogues". In the same year, she featured in Madhoship Studio's three-part short film Thadhu, which narrates the consequences of the COVID-19 outbreak, and the perception of lockdown in Male' City, through the eyes of three people. In the film she played the role of a hardworking frontline doctor working amid the COVID-19 pandemic. She recalled the project as "frightening experience" requiring the actors to wear extensive PPE kit. She was also part of the ensemble cast of Yoosuf Shafeeu's romantic comedy web-series Huvaa Kohfa Bunan, where she played the wife of a man who is a hardcore fan of a local actress.

The following year, she starred alongside Ismail Rasheed in Moomin Fuad's crime drama short film Feehaali, which got positive reviews from critics.

== Filmography ==
=== Feature film ===
Year	Title	Role	Notes	Ref(s)
2023	Nina	Abidha		
2024	Udhabaani 2	Natha		
2024	Kamanaa	Zulfa		
2026	Majunoon	Aayan's mother	Special appearance	

=== Television ===
Year	Title	Role	Notes	Ref(s)
2019–2020	Thin Bibee	Herself	Main role	
2020	Ehenas	Faruzana	Main role; 12 episodes	
2020	Gamini	Habeeba	Main role; 6 episodes	
2020–2021	Huvaa Kohfa Bunan	Shaaira	Main role	
2021	Mazloom	Niusha	Main role in "Chapter 2: Zarrook"	
2021	Girlfriends	Sara	Recurring role; 2 episodes	
2021	Noontha?	Herself	Guest role in the segment "Rules & Regulations"	
2022–2024	Vihaali	Shazu / Khadheeja	Main role in the segment "Lift Golhi" and "Khadheeja"	
2022	Shakuvaa	Amira	Main role; 5 episodes	
2022	Dharaka	Fazla	Recurring role; 4 episodes	
2022	Biruveri Vaahaka	Nisha	Main role; 6 episodes	
2022	Netheemey	Hudha	Main role; 5 episodes	
2023–2024	Yaaraa	Huya Qasim	Recurring role; 24 episodes	

=== Short film ===
Year	Title	Role	Notes	Ref(s)
2020	Thadhu	Dr. Nathasha		
2020	Feehaali	Azima		
2024	Aimi	Nasreena		
