= Bodufolhudhoo =

- Inhabited island
- Location in Maldives
- Coordinates: 04°11′05″N 72°46′25″E
- Country: Maldives
- Administrative atoll: Alif Alif Atoll
- Distance to Malé: 81.64 km (50.73 mi)

Dimensions
  - Length: 0.300 km (0.186 mi)
  - Width: 0.300 km (0.186 mi)

Population (2022)
  - Total: 704 (including foreigners)
- Time zone: UTC+05:00 (MST)

Bodufolhudhoo (Dhivehi: ބޮޑުފޮޅުދޫ) is one of the inhabited islands of Alif Alif Atoll in the Republic of Maldives.

== Geography ==
The island is 81.64 km (51 mi; 44 nmi) west of the country's capital, Malé. Bodufolhudhoo is a small island located in the central area of North Ari Atoll and surrounded by many famous tourist resorts, including Nika Island Resort, Velidoo and Gangehi.

=== Ecology ===
Bodufolhudhoo is the first island in the Maldives to ban single-use plastic bags.

== Demography ==
Historical population
Year	Pop.	±%
2006	456	—
2014	586	+28.5%
2022	704	+20.1%
2006-2022: Census populations Source:

== Economy ==
Bodufolhudhoo's economy has been based mostly on fishing until the early 1990s. The current economy is mainly supported by people working in the tourism industry.

There are a few tourist shops on the island for the guests who come island hopping from nearby resorts.

Bodufolhudhoo has over five operating guesthouses with more guest houses under development. The island council has designated a private beach (Sunset beach) specifically for the visiting tourists.

The inhabitants mainly work at nearby resorts, or on the island in education, administration, healthcare, utilities, shops, restaurants and guesthouses.

== Healthcare ==
There is a health centre in the island to provide basic health care service to the community. The health centre has a medical officer and two registered nurses and nearly 15 staff members.

== Transport ==
As Bodufolhudhoo is an island surrounded by sea, it can only be accessed by boat. There are boats that people use for transport between the islands. Larger vessels are used to travel to and from the capital Malé and for faster transport residents use a seaplane service from the nearby resorts. The government ferry system was introduced in 2012, whereby boats became available to travel between the islands at a cheaper fare.

People mostly walk on the island, but also use bicycles and motorbikes to travel from one place to another. Wheelbarrow "gaadiyaa" in different sizes are used to transport heavy materials.

In the early 1990s a nationwide helicopter service was provided by Hummingbird. To this day the helipad used by Hummingbird exists in Bodufolhudhoo.
