= Ukulhas =

Ukulhas އުކުޅަސް
- Inhabited island
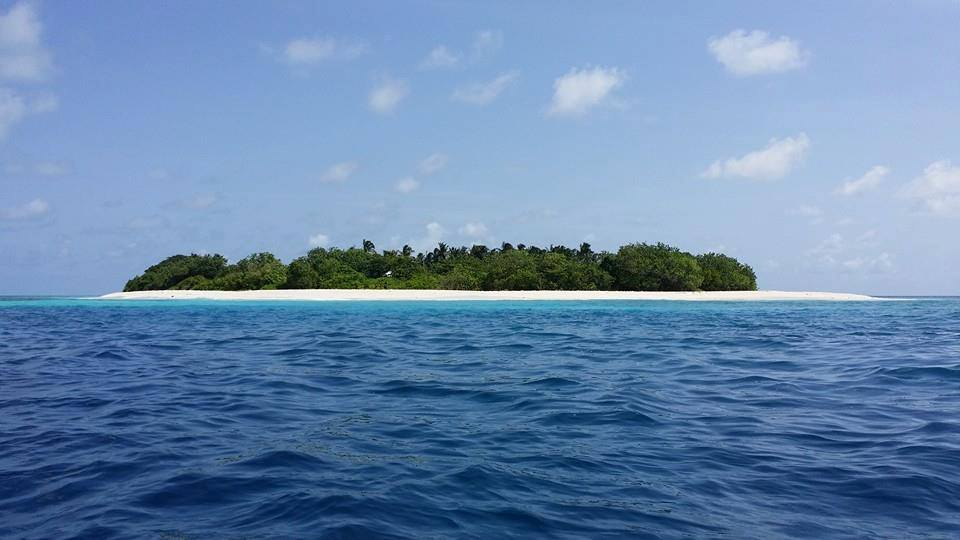
- Dhoani view of Ukulhas

- Location in Maldives
- Coordinates: 04°12′50″N 72°51′52″E
- Country: Maldives
- Geographic atoll: Ari Atoll
- Administrative atoll: Alif Alif Atoll
- Distance to Malé: 71.68 km (44.54 mi)

Area
  - Total: 1 km^{2} (0.39 sq mi)

Dimensions
  - Length: 1.025 km (0.637 mi)
  - Width: 0.225 km (0.140 mi)

Population (2022)
  - Total: 1,284
  - Density: 1,300/km^{2} (3,300/sq mi)
- Time zone: UTC+05:00 (MST)

Ukulhas (Dhivehi: އުކުޅަސް), one of the inhabited islands of Alif Alif Atoll, is an island in the Maldives.

Ukulhas is well known for its cleanliness, well-maintained waste management system and also known as first systematically waste managed island in the history of Republic of Maldives. Ukulhas conducts several cleaning and planting programs each year and organizes several awareness programs on waste management, marine ecosystems, and biodiversity. As being recognized as an environmental role model island in the Republic of Maldives, Ukulhas achieved a Green Leaf award in 2014 for its outstanding services on protecting and preserving the island's environment.

== Geography ==
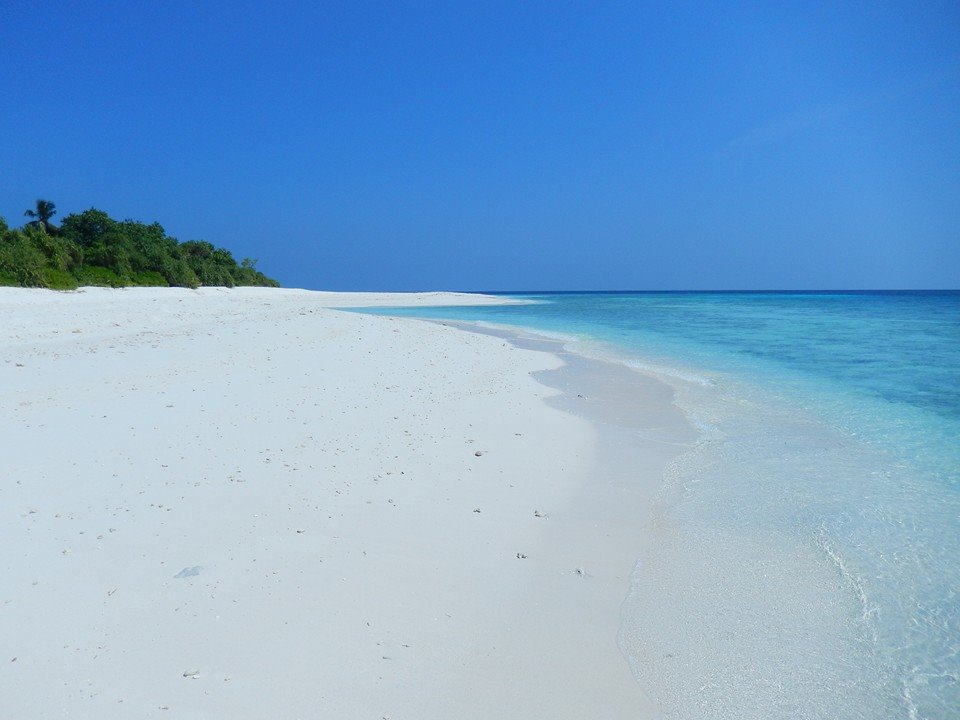
Sunset Beach in UKulhas

Ukulhas is close to the Northern boundary of Alif Alif Atoll, at 72° 51′ 52" E, 04° 12′ 54" N. The island is 71.68 km (45 mi; 39 nmi) west of the country's capital, Malé. It is an oval-shaped, flat coral sand cay, oriented North-West to South-East, 1025 meters long, 225 meters wide, for an area of 17.4 hectares.

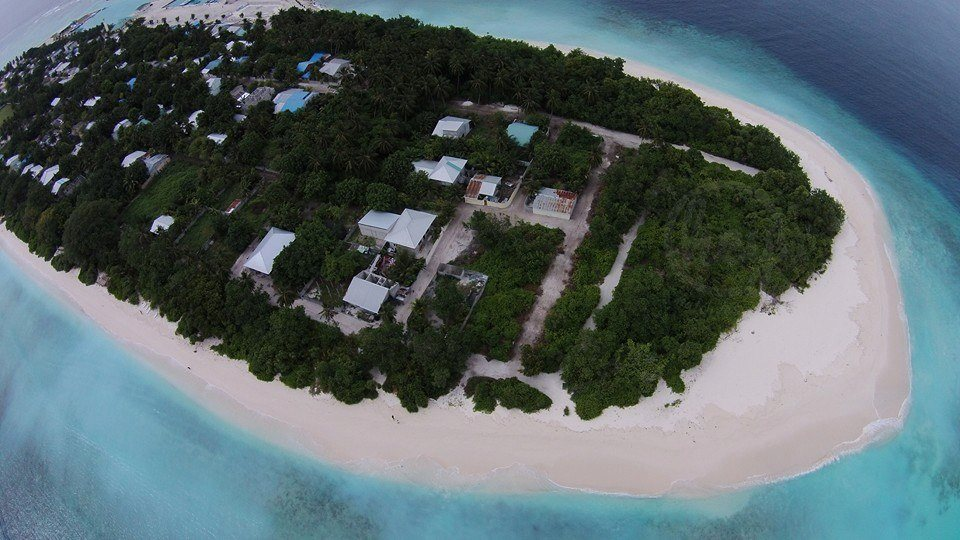
Bird's eye view of Ukulhas

=== Climate ===
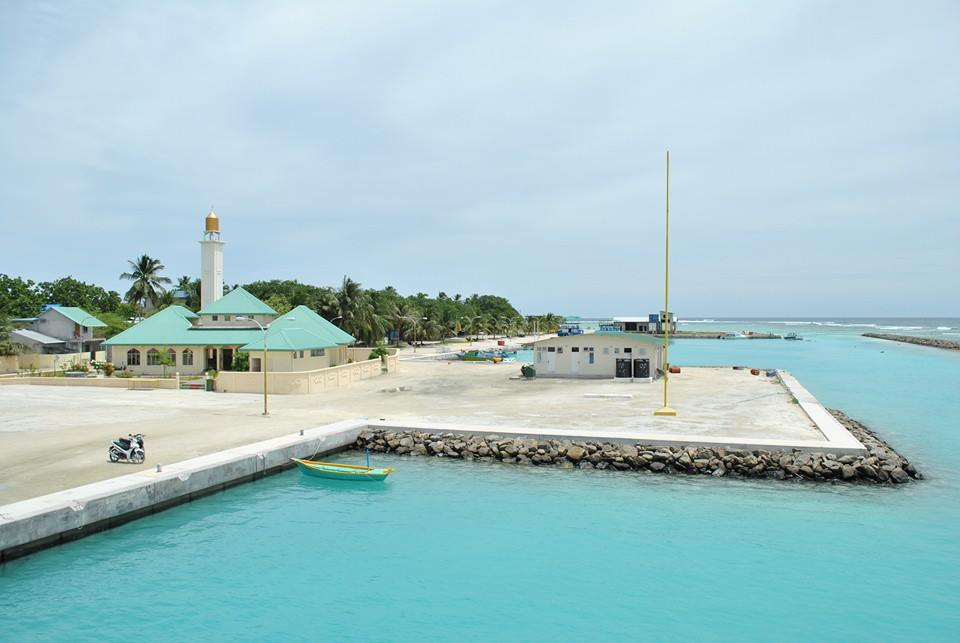
Harbor view of Ukulhas

Ukulhas has a tropical climate, with warm temperature throughout the year. The most substantial weather systems are monsoons. The southwest monsoon season lasts from May to November, and the northeast monsoon season goes from December to April. On average, April is the hottest month, and December is the coolest. February is often the driest month, with December to April being relatively dry. Thanks to its equatorial location, Ukulhas rarely experiences severe storms.

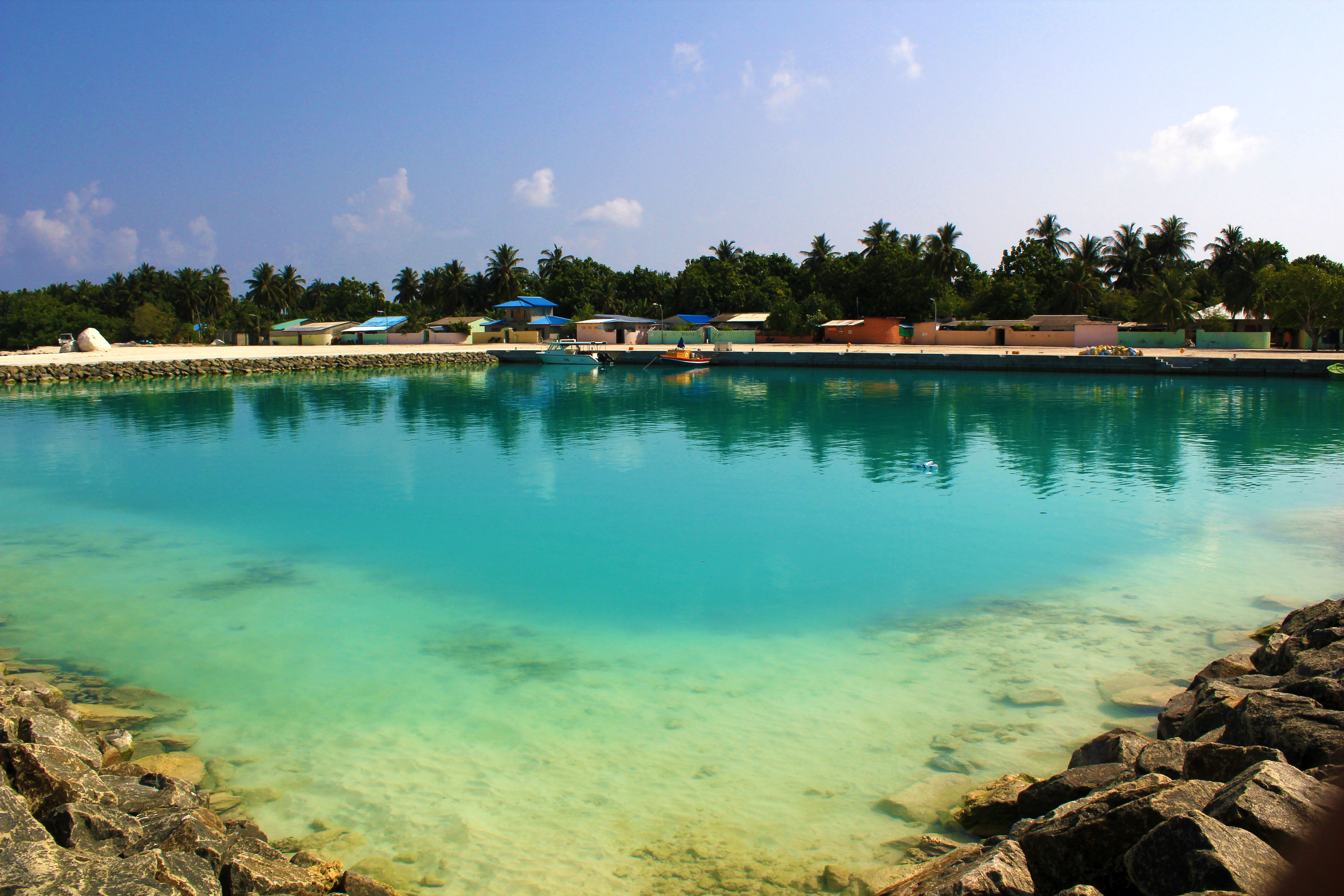
View of Ukulhas from the front jetty

== Demography ==
Historical population
Year	Pop.	±%
2006	615	—
2014	921	+49.8%
2022	1,284	+39.4%
2006-2022: Census populations Source:

== Governance ==
The island has experienced a series of political changes throughout the last couple of decades. Before the existence and the ratification of present constitution, the island had been entirely centralized by the central government. The island had a chief (Head of the Island) who had to be appointed by the Atoll chief (Head of Atoll). The atoll chief was a person who had to be appointed by the Minister of Atolls and Administration.

After the ratification of the present constitution dated on 7 August 2008, within the democratic movement in the government everything had revolved. The centralized system of the government had changed into a decentralized system. Local governments were formed in the name of local councils. Councilors were elected by the people of the island.

== Economy ==
=== Tourism ===
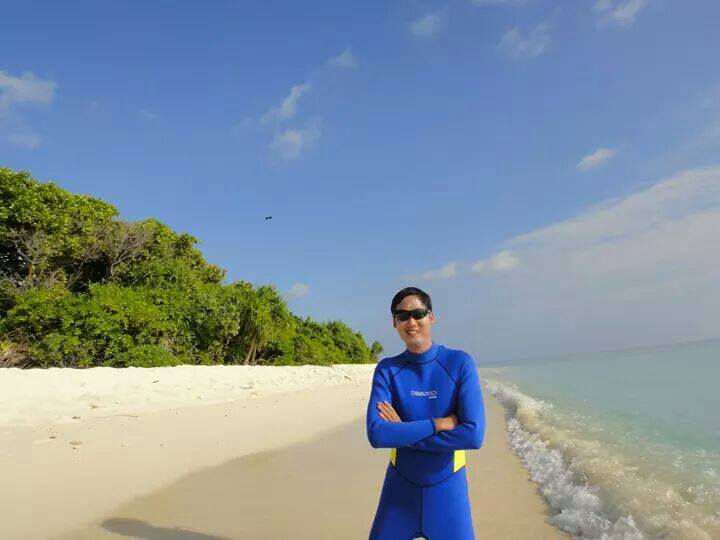
First tourist who formally visited Ukulhas

Tourism in Ukulhas formally started on 15 November 2012. The first guest house in Ukulhas is Ukulhas Inn which was founded by Ibrahim Shifaz Shaukath, Ever Blue, Aa. Ukulhas and registered on 12 September 2012.

=== Waste management ===
Ukulhas is well regarded as an environment friendly Island where the waste is managed in a systematic manner. As a result of its services to protect and preserve the vulnerable environment, Ukulhas achieved the ‘Green Leaf Award’ by the Maldivian government in 2014. Ukulhas implements huge cleaning programs, planting programs, several programs on waste management and programs on marine and biodiversity.

Today Ukulhas islanders do not require going out for dump their garbage; the island council manages island wastes in a systematic manner. For outside trash management, dustbins are kept in an adequate distance everywhere in the island.

== Education ==
=== Ukulhas School ===
GCE Advance Level Education in Ukulhas Island

The island’s Ukulhahu School is recognized as the first ever A-Level institution in the North Ari Atoll in the history of its archipelago. The A Level studies program was started and initiated with an immense effort led by the people of Ukulhas Island.

After the inauguration of the A-Level program, Ukulhas community composed an organizing and managing committee for the A-Level program in the name of “A Level Committee”.

Qualified students from other islands are invited to join the program with Ukulhas Community providing everything required for the whole A Level program including travel costs, accommodation, clothing, uniform, pocket money, books, stationeries etc. The Ukulhas community spends more than 1.5 million rufiyaa each year for the program.

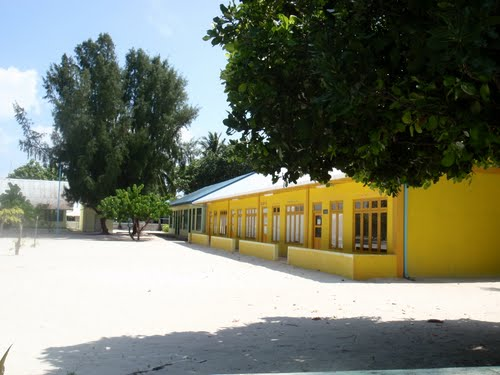
Ukulhas School

== Healthcare ==
Based on historical findings, there were no provisions of formal health services in Ukulhas before 1982. Before 1982 people in Ukulhas used to obtain health services from traditional medical practitioners. Traditional medical practitioners used to treat patients by using herbal medicine.

Formal health services were first established in Ukulhas at the island’s administrative office on 7 June 1982 by establishing an independent section with a local Family Health worker. The family health worker was a person who only qualified for the provision of limited, basic health services, such as local consultations, counseling, distribution of birth control drugs, dressing a wound, distribution of other symptomatic medicines etc. It was Family Health worker’s duty to visit local residences in a periodic manner to monitor the health standards of Islanders and to maintain records which have to be sent to the Concern central government Authorities.

After several years of limited health services provided by a local Family Health worker, people of Ukulhas found an independent health institution in the name of Health Post on 14 August 2004, with more facilities and equipment available than the ‘Family Health Section’. Health post provided two trained traditional birth attendants with Family Health workers.

On 1 June 2007, the day started with a new chapter by establishing a Health Center after many years of limited health services with a professional Medical Officer (Medical Doctor), Staff Nurses and Administrative staffs. Health Center is equipped with modern sophisticated equipment including, ECG machine, Nebulization facilities, IV injections etc. The Centre also designed with consultation rooms, admission wards, and other required facilities. The Health Centre started its operation with a Pharmacy and an ambulance which operates for urgent and exceptional matters.

Health Centre is operating with a qualified doctor who is assisted by nurses and is always on standby for urgent matters after his scheduled duty every day. The Centre is open for its services for Accidents and emergency care for 24 hours a day.

== Culture ==
Boduberu is one of the most popular forms of traditional music and dance founds in Ukulhas and the rest of the Maldives. Boduberu is performed by about 15 people, including four drummers with background and a lead singer. Bodu beru is played with a set of drums and an Onugan’du.

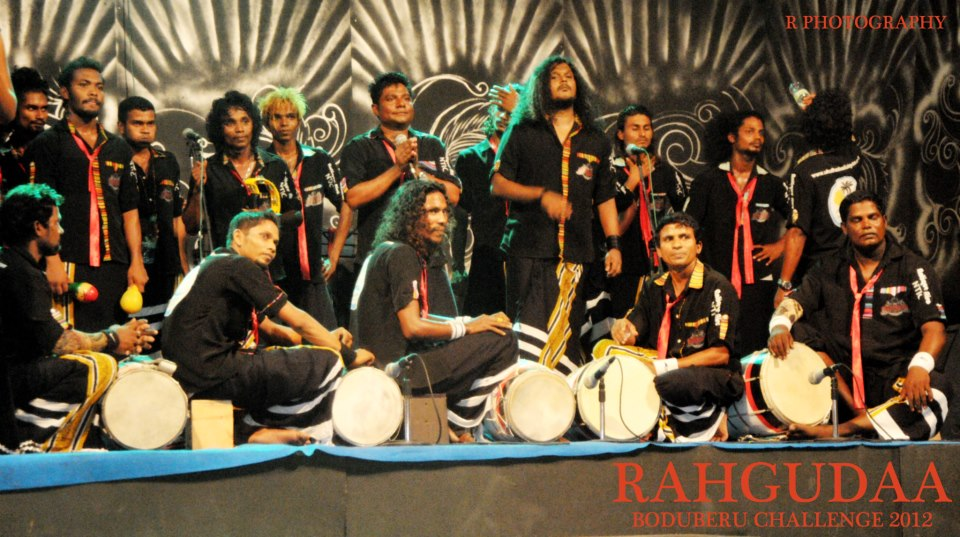
'Rahgudaa' (cultural music called 'Boduberu' band of Ukulhas)

Onudgadu is a small piece of bamboo which lays horizontal grooves, from which raspy sounds are produced by scraping. The songs may be of heroism, romance or satire. The prelude to the song is a slow with emphasis on drumming, and dancing. As the song reaches a crescendo, one or two dancers maintain the wild beat with their frantic movements ending in some cases in a terrace. The costume of the performers is a sarong and white sleeved shirt.

== Religion ==
=== Kudamiski'y ===
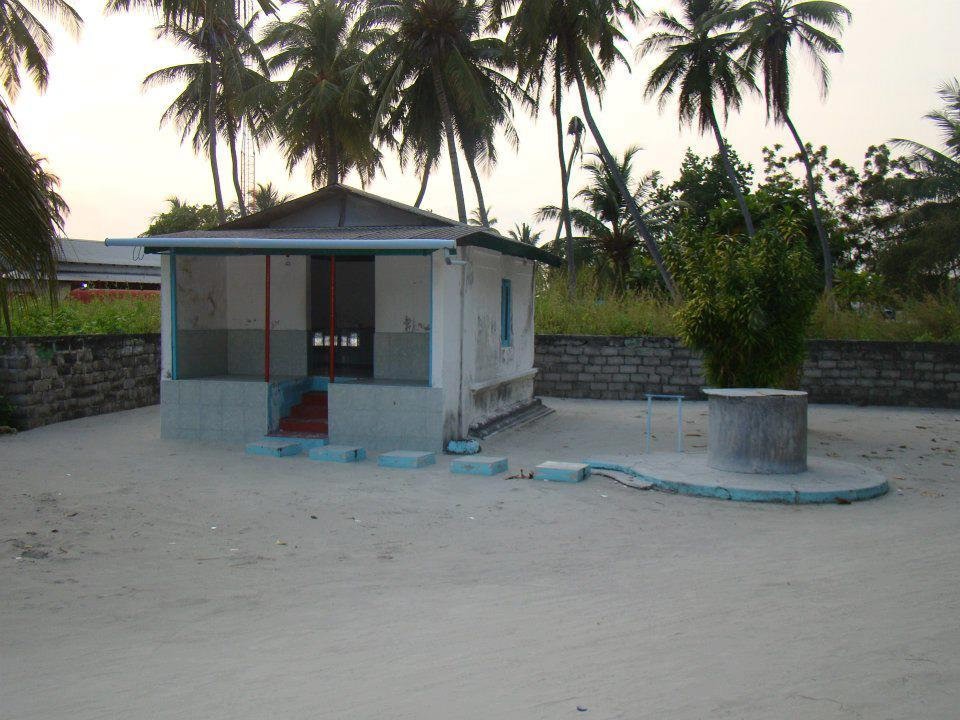
'Kudamikiy', the oldest mosque in Ukulhas

Kudamiski’y is the oldest mosque in Ukulhas. The oldest structure in the Ukulhas is 'Maamiskiy' or Kuda Miskiy (Old Friday Mosque), which was built in 1656, during the reign of Sultan Ibrahim Iskandar. The coral-stone structures walls are intricately carved with patterns.
