= Himandhoo =

Himandhoo ހިމަންދޫ
- Inhabited island
- Location in Maldives
- Coordinates: 03°55′15″N 72°44′35″E
- Country: Maldives
- Administrative atoll: Alif Alif Atoll
- Distance to Malé: 89.57 km (55.66 mi)

Dimensions
  - Length: 0.750 km (0.466 mi)
  - Width: 0.425 km (0.264 mi)

Population (2022)
  - Total: 885
- Time zone: UTC+05:00 (MST)

Himandhoo (Dhivehi: ހިމަންދޫ) is one of the inhabited islands of the Alif Alif Atoll in the Maldives.

== Geography ==
The island is 89.57 km (56 mi; 48 nmi) west of the country's capital, Malé. A short seaplane journey from Velana International Airport would take approximately 25–45 minutes to reach this pristine piece of land in the Northern Alif Atoll. Speedboat transfer options are also available to reach the island.

== Demography ==
Historical population
Year	Pop.	±%
2006	515	—
2014	667	+29.5%
2022	885	+32.7%
2006-2022: Census populations Source:

== Economy ==
Himandhoo has several guesthouses and is particularly popular for its proximity to rich marine environments.

In recent years, the island has seen major development efforts aimed at improving local infrastructure and connectivity. In 2020, the Maldives Transport and Contracting Company (MTCC) completed a major harbor development project on the island. This included dredging, quay wall construction, breakwaters, and modern harbour lighting. The project enhanced access to the island and supported the local economy by facilitating smoother transportation and trade.
