= Mathiveri =

Mathiveri މަތިވެރި
- Inhabited island
- Location in Maldives
- Coordinates: 04°11′25″N 72°44′50″E
- Country: Maldives
- Distance to Malé: 84.58 km (52.56 mi)

Dimensions
  - Length: 0.775 km (0.482 mi)
  - Width: 0.475 km (0.295 mi)

Population (July 2026)
  - Total: 1,106
- Time zone: UTC+05:00 (MST)

Mathiveri (Dhivehi: މަތިވެރި) is one of the eight inhabited islands of Alif Alif Atoll.

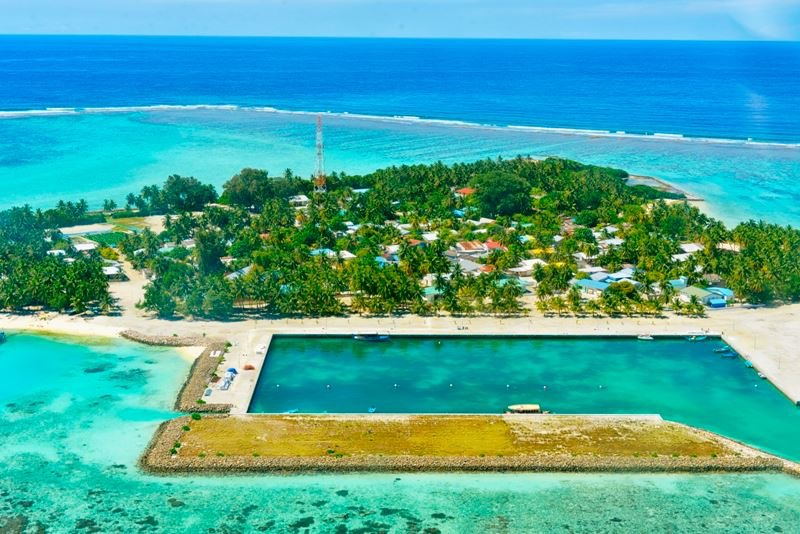

== Geography ==
The island is 84.58 km (53 mi; 46 nmi) west of the country's capital, Malé. Mathiveri is located at the central area of North ari atoll. Mathiveri is an inhabited local island located in the northern area of the Alif Alif Atoll (North Ari Atoll) in the Maldives, roughly 84.58 kilometers west of Malé. Measuring just about 775 meters long by 475 meters wide, it is a budget-friendly destination offering diving spots, marine life, and access to sandbanks.

== Demography ==
Historical population
| Year | Pop. | ±% |
|---|---|---|
| 2006 | 483 | — |
| 2014 | 623 | +29.0% |
| 2022 | 878 | +40.9% |
| 2026 | 1,106 | +26.0% |
2006-2026: Census populations Source:

== Governance ==
There is a police station on the island, and a magistrate court to provide law enforcement.

=== Island council ===
The current Island Council members are:

- Ismail Athif (PNC) President of the Council.
- Hussain Nihaan (PNC) Vice President of the Council.
- Shaiha Fahumy (PNC) member of the council.

== Economy ==
Main sources of economy of the island are fishing and tourism. The island has fishing boats which mainly involving in the yellow fin tuna fishing industry. All the fishing boats are registered and licensed under fish processing and exporting companies. These companies export the raw fish products to European countries.

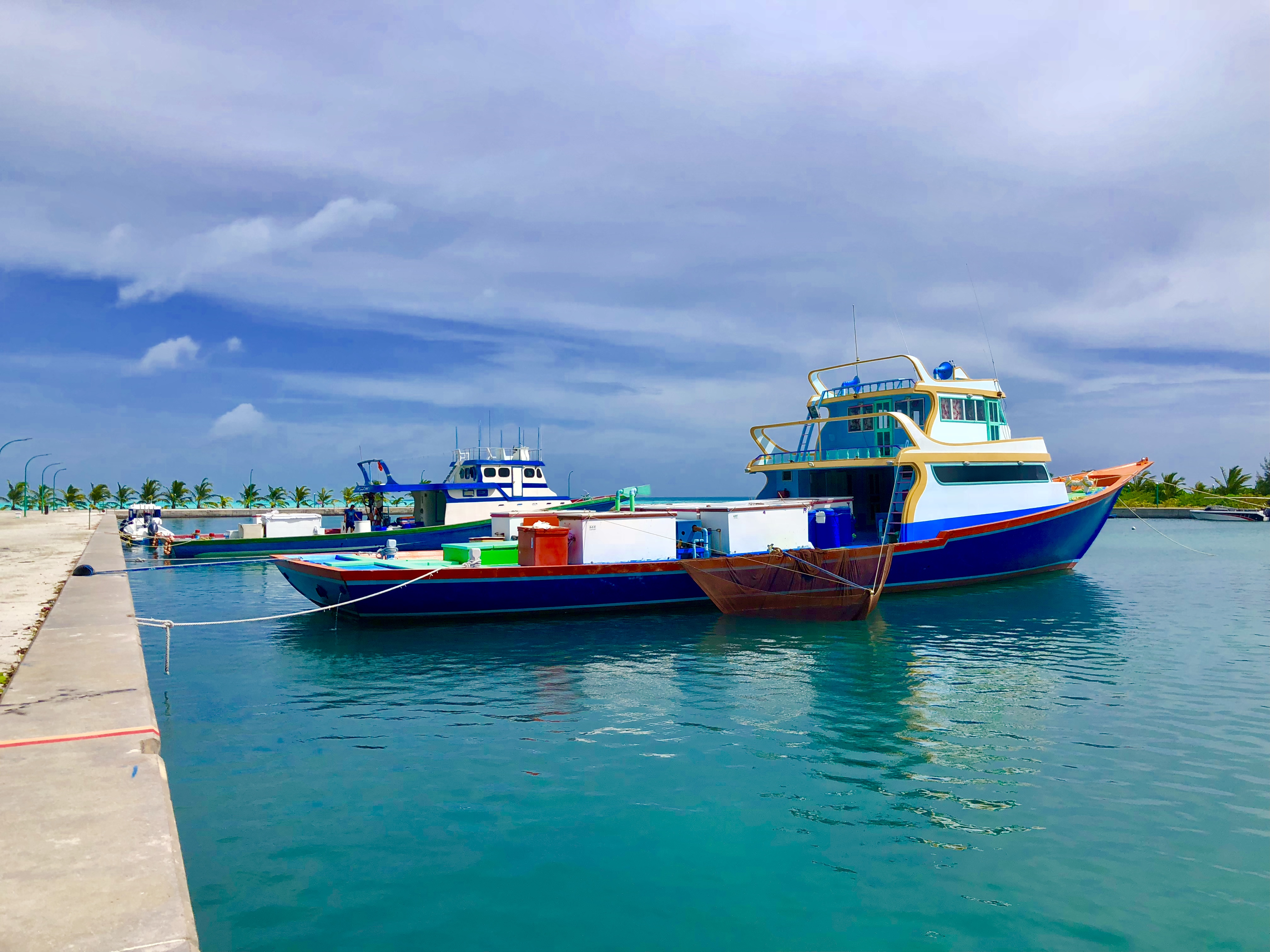

There are 10 guest houses in Mathiveri. Many of the people are working nearby tourist island resorts.

Key Highlights & Attractions

Mathiveri Finolhu (Picnic Island):

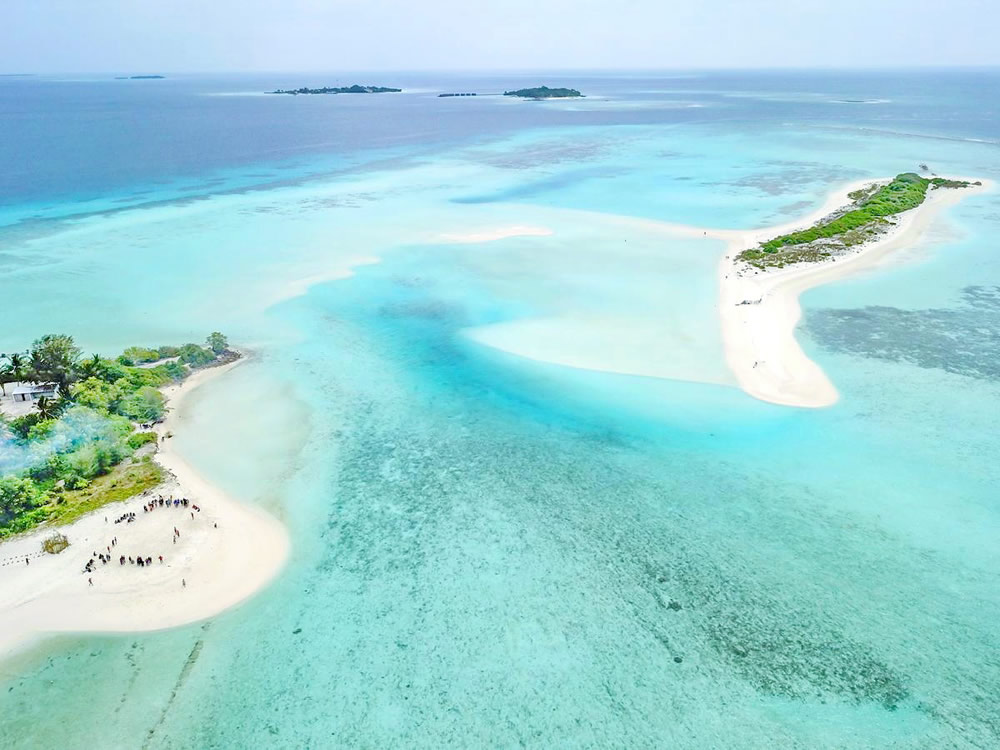

An uninhabited sandbank located 100 meters away. At low tide, visitors can wade or swim across to explore its white sands.

Stingray Beach: A quiet beach area where visitors can frequently observe stingrays resting in the shallows alongside small reef sharks.

Manta Ray Snorkeling: Positioned within a manta ray migration zone. Local operators run budget excursions to nearby hotspots.

House Reef Diving: The island functions as a prominent budget diving hub. It provides quick boat or swimming access to thriving coral ecosystems populated by diverse marine life.

Mathiveri Shipwreck: Mathiveri Shipwreck is a popular and shallow underwater attraction located approximately 1 to 1.5 kilometers offshore in the Mathiveri Lagoon. Resting at a manageable depth of roughly 4 to 10 meters, it is widely considered an easily accessible site for both free-diving snorkelers and scuba divers of all experience levels.

Shark Viewpoint: (often called Shark Point) in Mathiveri is a popular, zero-cost shore attraction located right at the island's main boat harbor pier. It offers an up-close look at marine wildlife directly from dry land, making it an evening gathering spot for both travelers and locals.

== Healthcare ==
Mathiveri Health Centre is the only health service provider in the island. The health centre has a medical officer and two registered nurses and nearly 15 staff members. The health centre is opened for 16 hours in a day.

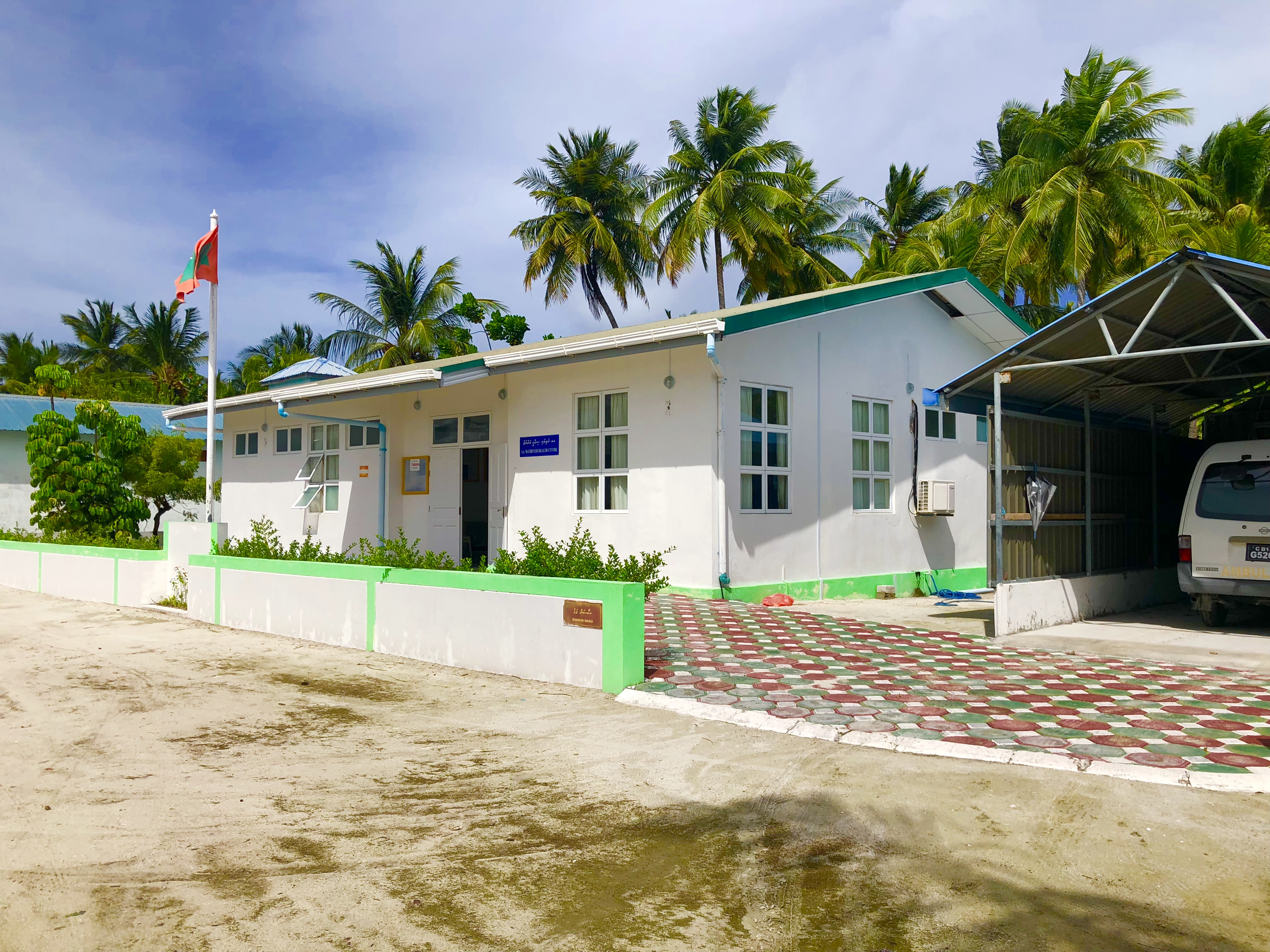

== Education ==
There is a school (up to grade 10) on the island to educate the children of the community. The principal of the school is Mr. Hassan Hameedh.

== Sports ==
In Mathiveri, football and handball are the island's primary sports. It has football ground and futsal grounds as well as hosting competitions. There is also a volley court.
