= Feridhoo =

Feridhoo ފެރިދޫ
- Inhabited island
- Location in Maldives
- Coordinates: 04°03′05″N 72°43′35″E
- Country: Maldives
- Administrative atoll: Alif Alif Atoll
- Distance to Malé: 87.96 km (54.66 mi)

Dimensions
  - Length: 1.125 km (0.699 mi)
  - Width: 0.575 km (0.357 mi)

Population (2022)
  - Total: 544
- Time zone: UTC+05:00 (MST)

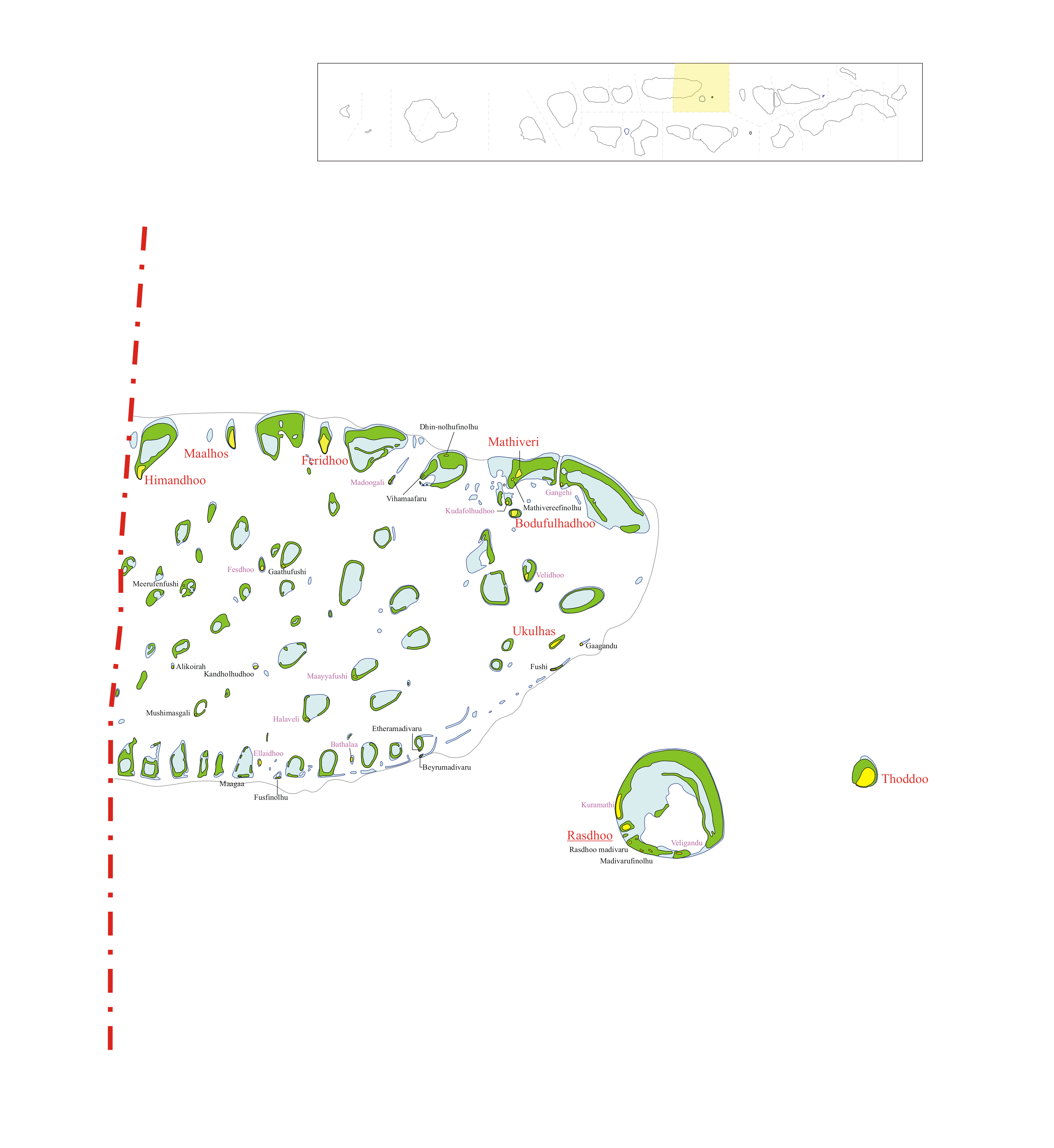
Map of Alif Alif Atoll

Feridhoo (Dhivehi: ފެރިދޫ) is one of the inhabited islands of Ari Atoll, located on its eastern fringe. It belongs to the Alif Alif Atoll administrative division.

== History ==
In centuries past, two male African slaves who had been bought by the kings on their Hajj trips to Mecca were formally released from slavery and were settled in this island. One of them was called Sangoru. He had been working for years at the palace in Malé before the ailing king released him in order to gain merit in the afterlife.

The freeing of slaves before the death of the owner was traditionally a common practice among the very high nobility in the Maldives. Now there are many families on Feridhoo and in neighboring Maalhos who can trace their descendency to those two African ancestors. one of the most famous families amongst this family is Abdhul Razzaq's family famous for boduberu

== Geography ==
The island is 87.96 km (55 mi; 47 nmi) west of the country's capital, Malé.

== Demography ==
Historical population
Year	Pop.	±%
2006	439	—
2014	413	−5.9%
2022	544	+31.7%
2006-2022: Census populations Source:
