= Alif Alif Atoll =

Alifu Alifu Atoll
- Atoll
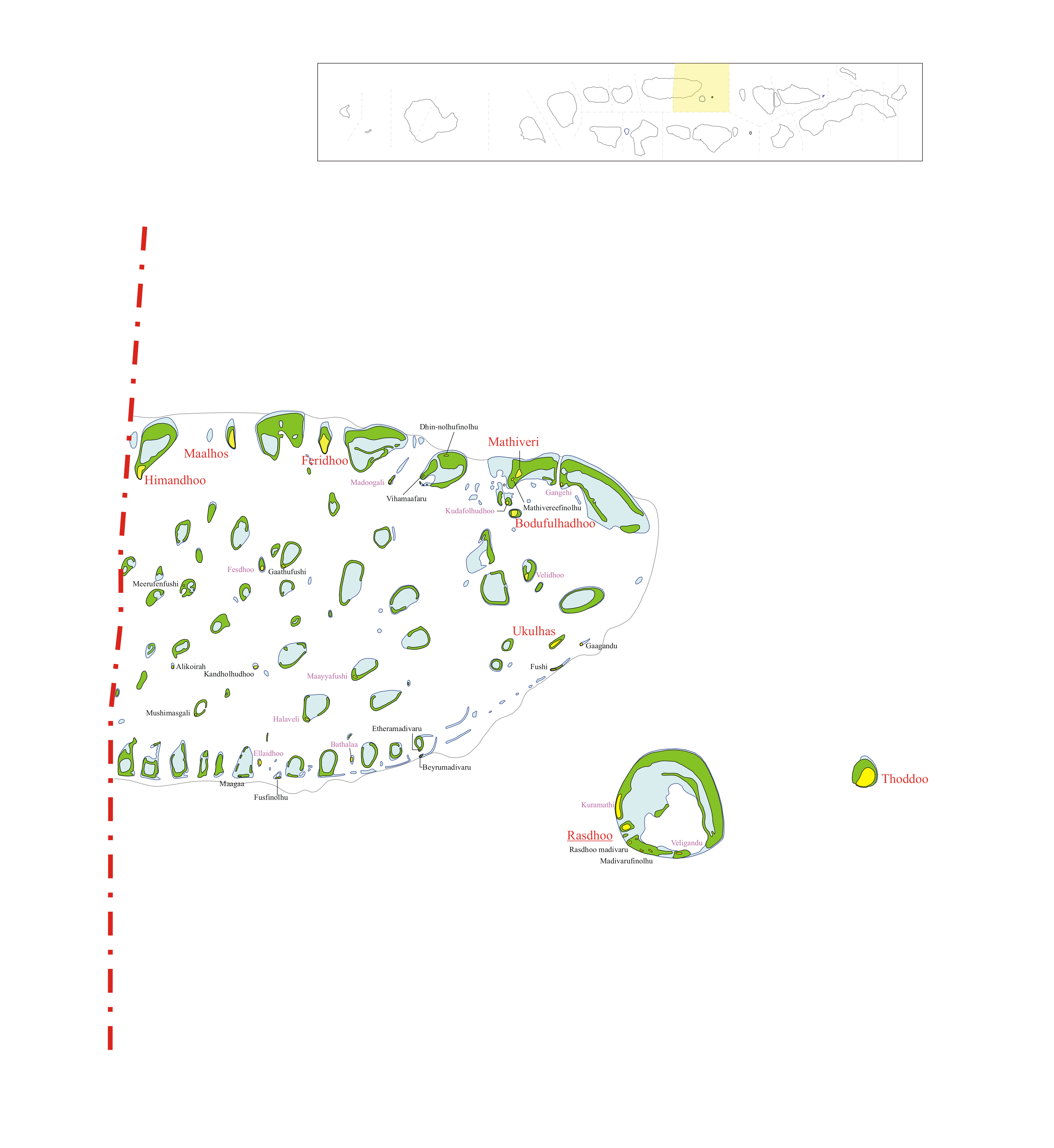

- Location in Maldives
- Country: Maldives
- Corresponding geographic atoll(s): Ari Atoll Uthuruburi
- Location: 4° N and 72.8° E
- Capital: Rasdhoo

Government
  - Atoll Chief

Population
  - Total: 5,905
- Letter code: U
- Dhivehi letter code: AA (އއ)
  - Number of islands: 33
  - Inhabited islands: Bodufolhudhoo; Feridhoo; Himandhoo; Maalhos; Mathiveri; Rasdhoo; Thoddoo; Ukulhas
  - Uninhabited islands: Alikoirah, Bathalaa*, Beyrumadivaru, Dhin-nolhufinolhu, Ellaidhoo*, Etheramadivaru, Fesdhoo*, Fusfinolhu, Fushi, Gaagandu, Gaathufushi*, Gangehi*, Halaveli*, Kandholhudhoo*, Kudafolhudhoo*, Kuramathi*, Maagaa, Maayyafushi*, Madivarufinolhu, Madoogali, Mathivereefinolhu, Meerufenfushi, Mushimasgali, Rasdhoo madivaru, Velidhoo*, Veligandu*, Vihamaafaru
- Resort islands(*), airports(¤) and industrial islands are also considered uninhabited.

Alif Alif Atoll (also known as Northern Ari Atoll or Ari Atholhu Uthuruburi) is an administrative division of the Maldives. It was created on March 1, 1984, combining northern section of Ari Atoll, the small Rasdhukuramathi Atoll, and the isolated island of Thoddoo. Many of the islands in this atoll have been inhabited since ancient times and have archaeological remains from the Maldivian Buddhist period.

The separation of Ari Atoll (formerly Alifu Atoll) into a Northern and a Southern section has formed the two most recent administrative divisions of the Maldives, namely Alifu Alifu Atoll and Alifu Dhaalu Atoll.

== Geography ==
The North Ari Atoll administrative division consists of the northern part of the geographic or natural atoll Ari Atoll (described as Northern Ari Atoll in this context to differentiate from the official name of the administrative division), Rasdhukuramathi Atoll and Thoddoo Island. The atolls consist of Inhabited Islands and Uninhabited Island, a definition which includes resort islands, airport islands and industrial islands.

=== Inhabited islands ===
Name	Population	Coordinates	Geographic Atoll/Island	Remarks
Bodufolhudhoo	586	4°11′7″N 72°46′23″E	Northern Ari Atoll	
Feridhoo	413	4°3′3″N 72°43′31″E	Northern Ari Atoll	
Himandhoo	667	3°55′15″N 72°44′38″E	Northern Ari Atoll	
Maalhos	408	3°59′13″N 72°43′11″E	Northern Ari Atoll	
Mathiveri	623	4°11′30″N 72°44′46″E	Northern Ari Atoll	
Rasdhoo	949	4°15′46″N 72°59′31″E	Rasdhukuramathi Atoll	Capital of North Ari Atoll administrative division, known as Ross Atoll in the Admiralty Charts
Thoddoo	2,023	4°26′20″N 72°57′31″E	Thoddoo Island	
Ukulhas	921	4°12′53″N 72°51′50″E	Northern Ari Atoll	

Maalhos: Maalhos is geographically the westernmost island of the atoll and the second-most westerly inhabited island of the Maldives after Maamakunudhoo. Vajrayana Buddhist remains have been found on this island.

Rasdhoo: Rasdhoo is the capital island of the North Ari Atoll administrative division. It has ferry connections with Malé as well as the other inhabited islands of the atoll. The island has several guesthouses catering to tourists visiting inhabited islands rather than resort islands.

=== Resort islands ===
Resort islands are classified as Uninhabited Islands which have been converted to become resorts. The following are the resort islands, with the official name of the resort.

Name	Resort Name	Coordinates	Geographic Atoll	Remarks
Bathalaa	Bathala Island Resort	4°4′13″N 72°56′43″E	Northern Ari Atoll	
Ellaidhoo	Ellaidhoo Maldives	4°0′22″N 72°56′56″E	Northern Ari Atoll	
Fesdhoo	W Maldives	4°0′24″N 72°48′39″E	Northern Ari Atoll	
Gaathafushi	Gaathufushi Private Island	4°1′24″N 72°48′38″E	Northern Ari Atoll	Owned by W Maldives
Gangehi	Gangehi Island Resort	4°13′12″N 72°45′18″E	Northern Ari Atoll	Owned by UHC Resorts
Halaveli	Constance Halaveli	4°2′17″N 72°55′9″E	Northern Ari Atoll	
Kan'dholhudhoo	Kandolhu Maldives	4°0′9″N 72°52′53″E	Northern Ari Atoll	
Kudafolhudhoo	Nika Island Resort	4°10′52″N 72°46′1″E	Northern Ari Atoll	
Kuramathi	Kuramathi Maldives	4°15′33″N 72°58′45″E	Rasdhukuramathi Atoll	
Maayafushi	Voi Maayafushi Resort	4°4′25″N 72°53′15″E	Northern Ari Atoll	
Velidhoo	Velidhoo Island Resort	4°11′41″N 72°49′6″E	Northern Ari Atoll	
Veligandu	Veligandu Island Resort	4°17′56″N 73°0′41″E	Northern Ari Atoll	

Veligandu: Veligandu covers 22 acres (8.9 ha) and is 600 metres long. It is a holiday resort with 91 rooms and a snorkelling reef. A large number of workers at the resort come from Sri Lanka and India. The island is linked to Male by seaplane services.

=== Other uninhabited islands ===
Name	Current usage	Coordinates	Geographic Atoll/Island	Remarks
Alikoirah		3°56′36″N 72°52′49″E	Northern Ari Atoll	
Etheremadivaru		4°7′7″N 72°56′16″E	Northern Ari Atoll	Earmarked for resort development by Emaar Group as Address Madivaru, scheduled for opening in 2020.
Fusfinolhu		4°1′6″N 72°57′30″E	Northern Ari Atoll	
Fushi		4°12′56″N 72°53′1″E	Northern Ari Atoll	
Gaagandu		4°13′58″N 72°51′54″E	Northern Ari Atoll	
Maagau		3°59′20″N 72°57′25″E	Northern Ari Atoll	
Madivaru		4°15′55″N 72°0′0″E	Northern Ari Atoll	Formerly Banyan Tree Madivaru, now closed
Madivarufinolhu		4°16′7″N 73°0′0″E	Rasdhukuramathi Atoll	
Madoogali		4°5′45″N 72°45′10″E	Northern Ari Atoll	
Mathivereefinolhu		4°11′6″N 72°45′2″E	Northern Ari Atoll	
Mushimasmigili		3°57′32″N 72°54′47″E	Northern Ari Atoll	
Vihamaafaru		4°7′19″N 72°44′47″E	Northern Ari Atoll	

== Gallery ==
An isolated spit in the middle of the Rasdhukuramathi Atoll

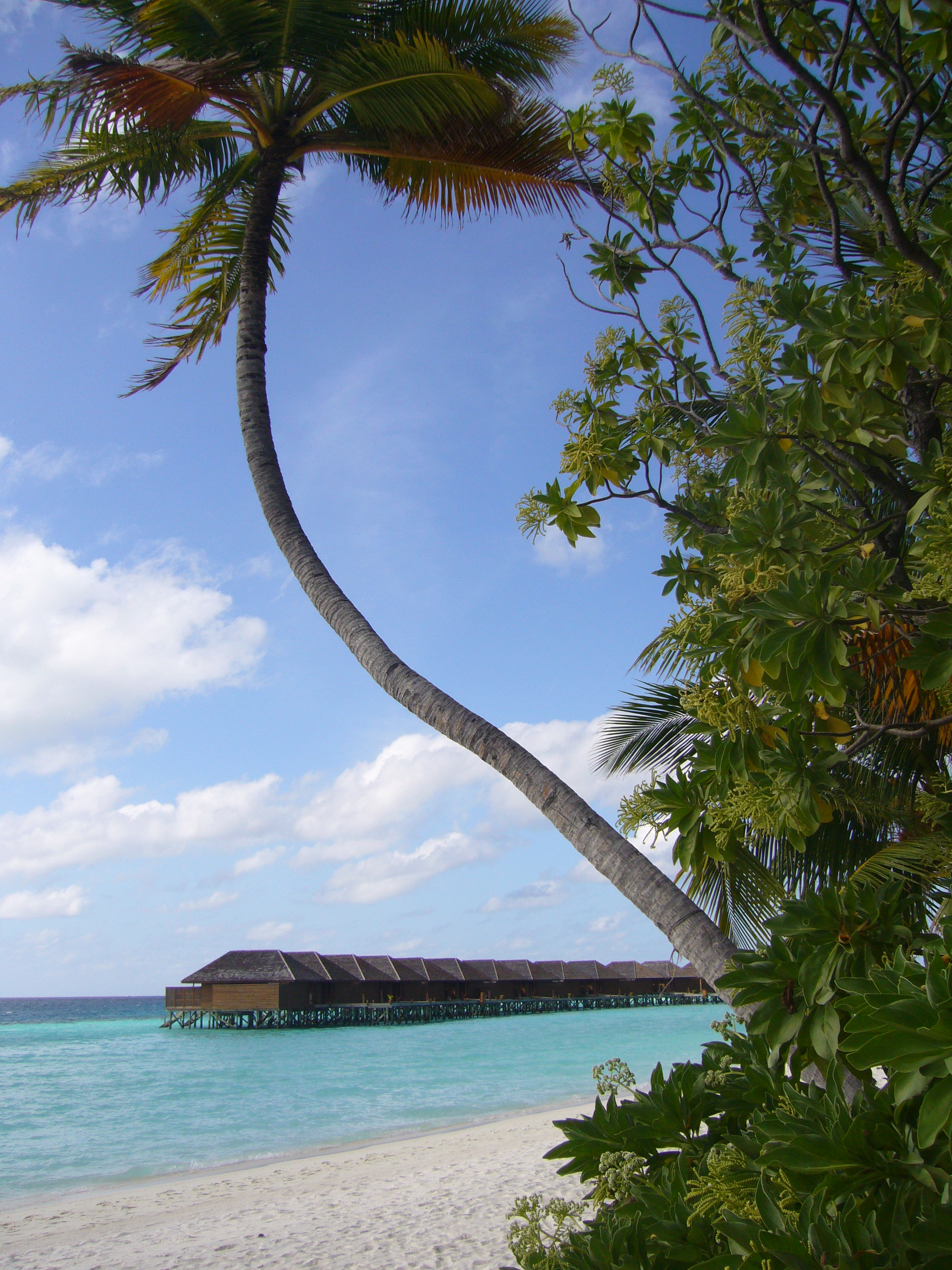
Veligandu Island resort
