= India–Maldives relations =

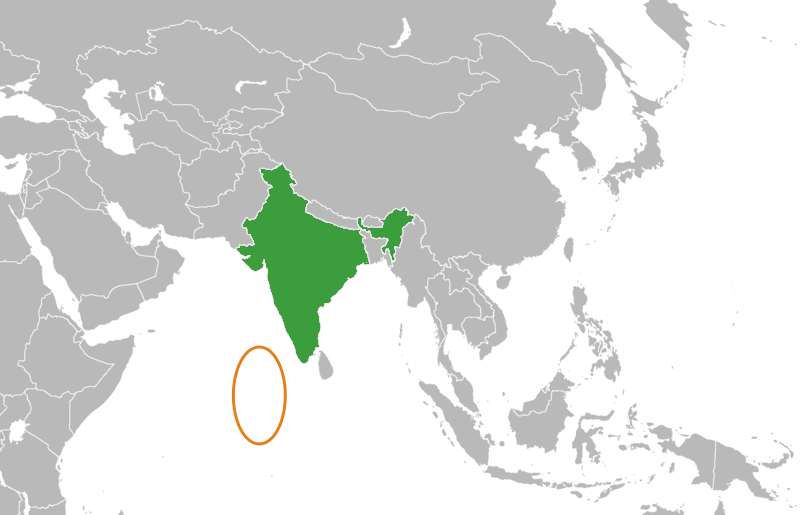
- India: Maldives

Diplomatic mission
- High Commission of India, Malé: High Commission of the Maldives, New Delhi

Envoy
- High Commissioner Shri Gangadharan Balasubramanian: High Commissioner Aishath Azeema

India and Maldives are neighbours sharing a maritime border. India continues to contribute to maintaining security as well as providing financial aid on the island nation.

However, tensions have increased as President of the Maldives Mohamed Muizzu has imposed an "India-Out" campaign and the country is deepening ties with China. Along with this, recent incidents of ministers of the Maldives insulting the islands of Lakshadweep and the Prime Minister of India, Narendra Modi, have heightened tensions.

It represents India's second-largest ongoing plantation infrastructure endeavor, following the $500 million Greater Malé Project. The Greater Malé Project aims to link the capital with three adjacent highlands through a 6.74-kilometer-long sea bridge.

Both India and the Maldives are republics in the Commonwealth of Nations.

India has a High Commission in Malé, and the Maldives has a High Commission in New Delhi.

In July 2025, India extended a 4,850 crore line of credit to the Maldives. The two sides also agreed to reduce the Maldives’ annual debt repayment to India by 40% and signed six cooperation pacts in areas including fisheries, digital infrastructure, and health.

== History ==
Maldives is located south of India's Lakshadweep Islands in the Indian Ocean. Both nations established diplomatic relations after the independence of Maldives from British rule in 1965. India was one of the first nations to recognise Maldives' independence. Since then, India and Maldives have developed close strategic, military, economic and cultural relations. India has supported Maldives' policy of keeping regional issues and struggles away from itself, and the latter has seen friendship with India as a source of aid as well as a counterbalance to Sri Lanka, which is in proximity to the island nation and its largest trading partner.

== Bilateral treaties and strategic partnership ==
=== 1976 Maritime treaty ===
In December 1976, India and the Maldives signed a maritime boundary treaty to agree on maritime boundaries. Treaty explicitly places Minicoy on the Indian side of the boundary. India and Maldives officially and amicably decided their maritime boundary in 1976. A minor diplomatic incident occurred in 1982 when President Maumoon Abdul Gayoom's brother, Abdulla Hameed gave a speech that India mistook as a claim that the neighboring Minicoy Island that belonged to India were a part of Maldives; Maldives rapidly officially denied that it was laying claim to the island and explained that President Maumoon's brother had in fact been talking about the cultural connections between Maldives and Minicoy.

=== 1981 Comprehensive trade agreement ===
In 1981, India and Maldives signed a comprehensive trade agreement. Both nations are founding members of the South Asian Association for Regional Cooperation (SAARC), the South Asian Economic Union and signatories to the South Asia Free Trade Agreement. Indian and Maldivian leaders have maintained high-level contacts and consultations on regional issues.

=== Commercial relations ===
Since the success of Operation Cactus, the relations between India and Maldives have expanded significantly. India has provided extensive economic aid and has participated in bilateral programmes for the development of infrastructure, health, telecommunications and labour resources. It established the Indira Gandhi Memorial Hospital in Malé, the capital of Maldives, expanded telecommunications and air links and increased scholarships for Maldivian students. While India's exports to Maldives during 2006 were worth ₹384 crore, imports were worth less than ₹6 crore. The State Bank of India has contributed more than US$500 million to aid the economic expansion of Maldives. India and Maldives have announced plans to jointly work to expand fisheries and tuna processing.

India-Maldives Trade Figures (in million US$)
Year	India's Exports	India's Imports	Total Trade	India's Balance of Trade
2015	225.82	3.00	228.82	222.81
2016	274.55	1.55	276.10	273.00
2017	282.04	4.12	286.16	277.93
2018	286.13	3.01	289.14	283.12
2019	290.27	3.42	293.69	286.85
2020	242.82	3.33	246.15	239.49
2021	317.35	5.94	323.29	311.41
2022 (Jan – April)	131.33	2.78	134.11	128.55

=== Military relations ===
In April 2006, the Indian Navy gifted a Trinkat Class Fast Attack Craft of 46 m length to the Maldives National Defence Force's Coast Guard.

India started the process to bring the island country into India's security grid. The move comes after the moderate Islamic nation approached New Delhi earlier in 2009, over fears that one of its island resorts could be taken over by terrorists given its lack of military assets and surveillance capabilities. India has also signed an agreement which includes following:

- India will permanently base two helicopters in the country to enhance its surveillance capabilities and ability to respond swiftly to threats.
- Maldives has coastal radars on only two of its 26 atolls. India will help set up radars on all 26 for seamless coverage of approaching vessels and aircraft.
- The coastal radar chain in Maldives will be networked with the Indian coastal radar system. India has already undertaken a project to install radars along its entire coastline. The radar chains of the two countries will be interlinked and a central control room in India's Coastal Command will get a seamless radar picture.
- The Indian Coast Guard (ICG) will carry out regular Dornier sorties over the island nation to look out for suspicious movements or vessels. The Southern Naval Command will overlook the inclusion of Maldives into the Indian security grid.
- Military teams from Maldives will visit the tri-services Andaman Nicobar Command (ANC) to observe how India manages security and surveillance of the critical island chain.
- Ekuverin, an annual joint military exercise is held every year since 2009 between India and Maldives. The exercise aims to enhance the interoperability between the Indian Army and Maldives National Defence Force in order to effectively undertake counter-terrorism operations in urban or semi-urban environments.

== Operations and events ==
=== 1988 Maldives coup d'état attempt ===
The 1988 Maldives coup d'état attempt was by a group of Maldivians led by businessman Abdullah Luthufi and assisted by armed mercenaries of a Tamil secessionist organisation from Sri Lanka, the People's Liberation Organisation of Tamil Eelam, to overthrow the government in the island republic of Maldives. The mercenaries quickly gained control of the capital, including the major government buildings, airport, port, television and radio stations. The intervention by the Indian Armed Forces, codenamed Operation Cactus, defeated the attempted coup.

The Indian paratroopers immediately secured the airfield, crossed over to Malé using commandeered boats and rescued President Gayoom. The paratroopers restored control of the capital to President Gayoom's government within hours. Some of the mercenaries fled toward Sri Lanka in a hijacked freighter. Those unable to reach the ship in time were quickly rounded up and handed over to the Maldives government. Nineteen people reportedly died in the fighting, most of them mercenaries. The dead included two hostages killed by the mercenaries. The Indian Navy frigates Godavari and Betwa intercepted the freighter off the Sri Lankan coast, and captured the mercenaries. The swift intervention by the Indian military and accurate intelligence successfully quelled the attempted coup d'état.

=== 2014 Malé Water Shortage Crisis (MWSC) ===
In the wake of a drinking water crisis in Malé on 4 December 2014, following collapse of the island's only water treatment plant, Maldives urged India for immediate help. India came to rescue by initiating Operation Neer sending its heavy lift transporters like C-17 Globemaster III, Il-76 carrying bottled water. The Indian Navy also sent her ships like INS Sukanya, INS Deepak and others which can produce fresh water using their onboard desalination plants. The humanitarian relief efforts by the Indian side was widely appreciated in Malé across all sections of people, with the vice-president of Maldives thanking the Indian ambassador for swift action.

=== 2011–2015 Maldives political crisis ===
Maldives' first democratically elected president from 2008 to 2012, Mohammed Nasheed, was arrested on 22 February 2015 on terror charges. India and US expressed concern over Nasheed's arrest and manhandling. Indian PM Modi was to also visit Maldives in the second week of March as a part four nation visit to Indian Ocean neighbours. But, he later omitted Maldives from his tour.

=== 2020 COVID-19 crisis ===
During the COVID-19 crisis of 2020, India extended help to Maldives in the form of financial, material and logistical support.

In April 2020, India provided $150 million currency swap support to help Maldives mitigate the financial impact of COVID-19. Also in April, at the request of the Maldivian government, the Indian Air Force airlifted 6.2 tonnes of essential medicines and hospital consumables to Maldives, as part of 'Operation Sanjeevani'. These supplies had been procured by Maldives's State Trading Organisation from suppliers in India, but could not be transported due to the COVID-19 lockdown. India had also earlier despatched a medical team with essential medicines to help Maldives fight the COVID outbreak as well as supplied essential food grains and edibles despite logistical challenges in wake of lockdown. This operation was called Operation Sanjeevani.

=== Civil society perception of India ===
Maldivians generally regard Indians and India as a friends and trusted neighbour in the economic, social and political fields, although there has been a strong anti-India stance taken by some sections of the society, expressed under the 'India Out' campaign, which was alleged by the Indian High Commission to be "motivated, malicious, and increasingly personal". Both nations share historical and cultural ties.

=== 2024 India–Maldives diplomatic row ===
Relations faced a strain in January 2024 due to derogatory remarks by Maldivian officials and concerns over racism, targeted towards Indian Prime Minister Narendra Modi as well as India. Maldivian President Mohamed Muizzu is widely seen to be pro-China, meaning souring relations with India.

This was seen very negatively in India, with citizens calling for a boycott of vacations in Maldives, with many renowned Bollywood actors and personalities criticising the Maldivian government. This also led to the death of a young Maldivian teenager, who had to be taken to India via an air ambulance, after the request at the last minute was denied by Maldivian authorities due to the ongoing tensions against the country.

On May 9, Indian ministry of External Affairs (MEA) spokesperson Randhir Jaiswal the diplomatic meeting between S Jaishankar and his Maldivian counterpart Zameer. Indian MEA spokesperson also confirmed the process of appointment of "competent Indian technical personnel" in place of Indian troops to keep running the Indian aviation platforms which are crucial for evaluation and other humanitarian assistance and disaster response (HADR) activities in Maldives.

=== Reset in relations ===
In August, 2024, both India and the Maldives agreed to sort out differences following Indian minister S. Jaishankar's visit to the Maldives, following a visit by the Maldivian PM to India to attend Modi's swearing-in ceremony in June. Ties have improved significantly since then. India has announced new investments and cooperation to help build infrastructure in the Maldives.

== Joint Projects in Maldives ==
=== Uthuru Thila Falhu Naval Base Harbour ===
India extended a $50 million line of credit to Maldives for defense projects, mainly for the development, support and maintenance of the harbour of the Uthuru Thila Falhu Naval Base.

=== Greater Malé Connectivity Project ===
In 2021, the Maldivian Ministry of National Planning, Housing and Infrastructure signed a $500 million infrastructure project for a 6.7 km bridge & causeway link with the Indian engineering company AFCONS. The 6.74-km bridge and causeway link will connect the capital of Malé with the islands of Villingili, Gulhifalhu and Thilafushi. It is being funded through a grant of $100 million and a line of credit of $400 million from India, and will boost connectivity between the four islands that account for almost half of the Maldivian population. India's engagement in the Maldives encompasses various infrastructure initiatives, such as the Greater Malé Connectivity Project.

=== Water and sanitation projects ===
In 2024, President Mohamed Muizzu and Indian Minister of External Affairs S. Jaishankar jointly inaugurated water and sanitation projects in 28 islands. This initiative aimed to provide access to safe drinking water, benefiting 32 islands, and to introduce sewerage systems in 17 islands. The project impacted the lives of over 28,000 Maldivians. With a total funding of $100 million, it represented the largest climate adaptation effort implemented in the Maldives through international collaboration.

== See also ==
- Indians in the Maldives
- Maldivians in India
- South Asian Association for Regional Cooperation (SAARC)
