= Thilamalé Bridge =

Bridge connecting Malé, Villingili, and Thilafushi in the Maldives

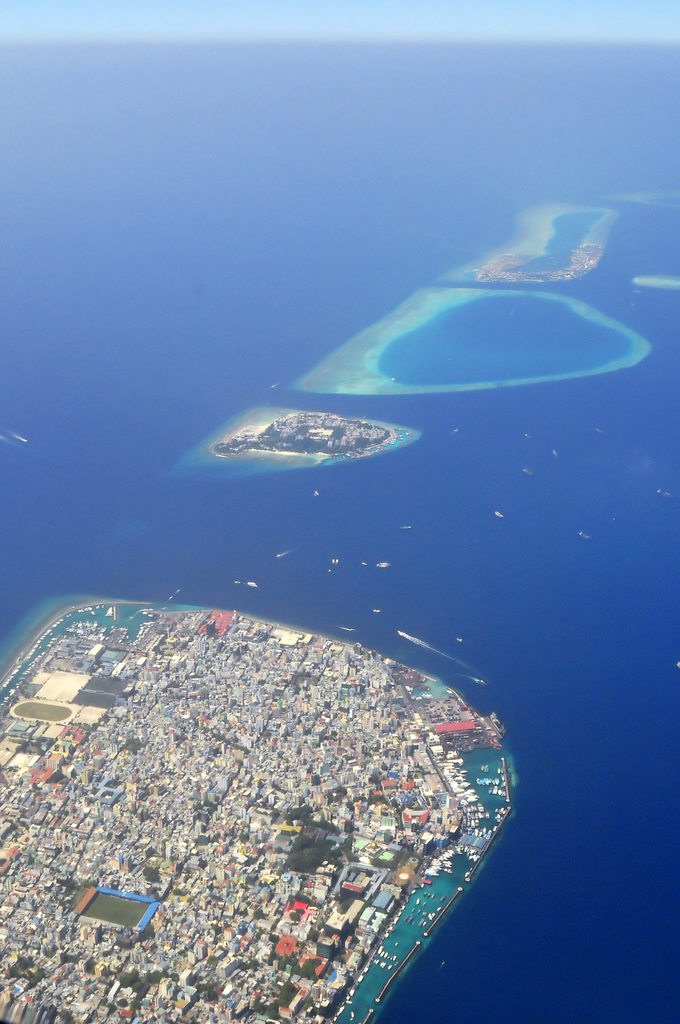
- The islands to be connected: from bottom Malé, Villingili, Gulhifalhu and Thilafushi
- Coordinates: 4°10′16″N 73°28′47″E
- Crosses: Malé, Villingili, Gulhifalhu and Thilafushi
- Locale: Maldives
- Official name: Greater Malé Connectivity Project

Characteristics
- Total length: 6.74 km

History
- Constructed by: Afcons Infrastructure

Location
- Interactive map of Thilamalé Bridge

The Thilamalé Bridge, also known as the Malé-Thilafushi Bridge and more formally known as the Greater Malé Connectivity Project (GMCP), is a road project currently under construction that aims to link the Maldivian capital Malé with the islands of Villingli, Gulhifalhu, and Thilafushi. This project has been said to be "the largest-ever infrastructure project in the Maldives." Once completed the total length of the project would be 6.74 km, of which 3.6 km would be bridges or viaducts over water. Before this, the largest connectivity project in the Maldives was the 1.4 km Sinamalé Bridge connecting Malé to the Maldives airport in Hulhulé island, and to the Hulhumale island.

The project is the result of bilateral consultation between India and the Maldives and was first proposed during the visit of India's External Affairs Minister to Malé in September 2019. As of July 2026, construction is 76% complete, and was projected to be completed by September 2026, however by March 2026 it was announced that progress was slower than expected, in part due to challenges to legal challenges over the budget, and the bridge is now expected to be completed by 2027.

== Need for the bridge ==
Malé is the capital of Maldives, located on the island of the same name measuring 8.3 square kilometres, and in which nearly 40% of the national population lives. Malé is one of the most densely populated cities globally. Malé has often been described as an overcrowded island which has little expanse for the city to expand.

This pushed the current government in the Maldives to consider decentralization, manifesting in the growth of other inhabited islands and furnishing them with civic amenities like hospitals and other institutions in an attempt to incentivize people to relocate to other islands, reducing the burden of Malé. With this bridge, connectivity and transportation to the capital city would also improve, opening up an alternative transport route, which has been a persistent problem for the country's people.

== Construction plans ==
The plan proposes the construction of three navigation bridges of 140 m main span across the deep channel between each island, 1.41 km of marine viaduct in deep water, 2.32 km marine viaduct in shallow water or on land, and 2.96 km of at-grade roads.

While the land interchanges at Malé and Villingili will be signalised junctions, the ones at the Gulhifalhu and Thilafushi will be roundabouts.

== Finances ==
Following a five-year grace period, the interest rate is 1.75% and the Maldives has to return it through a 20-year time. In the $500 million, $100 million is on grant, while $400 million is on Line of Credit by the EXIM Bank.

=== Chinese debt-trap allegations ===
When the deal was first declared, former President of Maldives Mohamed Nasheed, had referred to China's debt-trap loans to the former Yameen administration in a tweet: "The super low cost development assistance announced by @DrSJaishankar today is exactly what Maldives needs. Real help from a friend, to help us develop critical infrastructure. Rather than eye-wateringly costly financial loans that leaves the country mired in debt. @PMOIndia."

There is also a conflict about the amount of debt Maldives owes to China. Nasheed states that the island nation has $3.4 billion debt to China, meanwhile the Chinese ambassador to the country says that it is just $1.4 billion. Either of them are a huge sum of money for a country whose yearly GDP is only $4.9 billion.

== See also ==
- India–Maldives relations
- AFCONS
- Sinamalé Bridge
