= Ali Niyaf =

Maldivian neurosurgeon (born 1980)

- Born: 29 October 1980 (age 46); Malé, Maldives
- Education: Kursk State Medical University (MBBS)
- Medical career
- Profession: Neurosurgeon

Ali Niyaf (Dhivehi: އަލީ ނިޔާފް; born 29 October 1980) is the first Maldivian neurosurgeon. He was the president of the Maldivian Medical Association from 2019 to 2024. He was instrumental in building the First Neurosurgery establishment in the Maldives at the ADK Hospital. Niyaf conducted the first successful live surgery in the Maldives.

== Brain and Spine Conference ==
Niyaf initiated the Neurosurgery conference series Brain & Spine in 2017, which is attended by neurosurgeons from the United States, Germany, Philippines and Nepal.

== Authorship ==
Niyaf has co-authored Neurosurgery publications in Management of adhesive intestinal obstruction, Giant Brain Abscess in a Neonate Managed with External Drainage, Comparative Analysis of Efficacy of Endoscopic versus Open Carpal Tunnel Release.
