= Sinamalé Bridge =

Bridge connecting Malé and Hulhumalé in the Maldives

Sinamalé Bridge ސިނަމާލެ ފާލަން
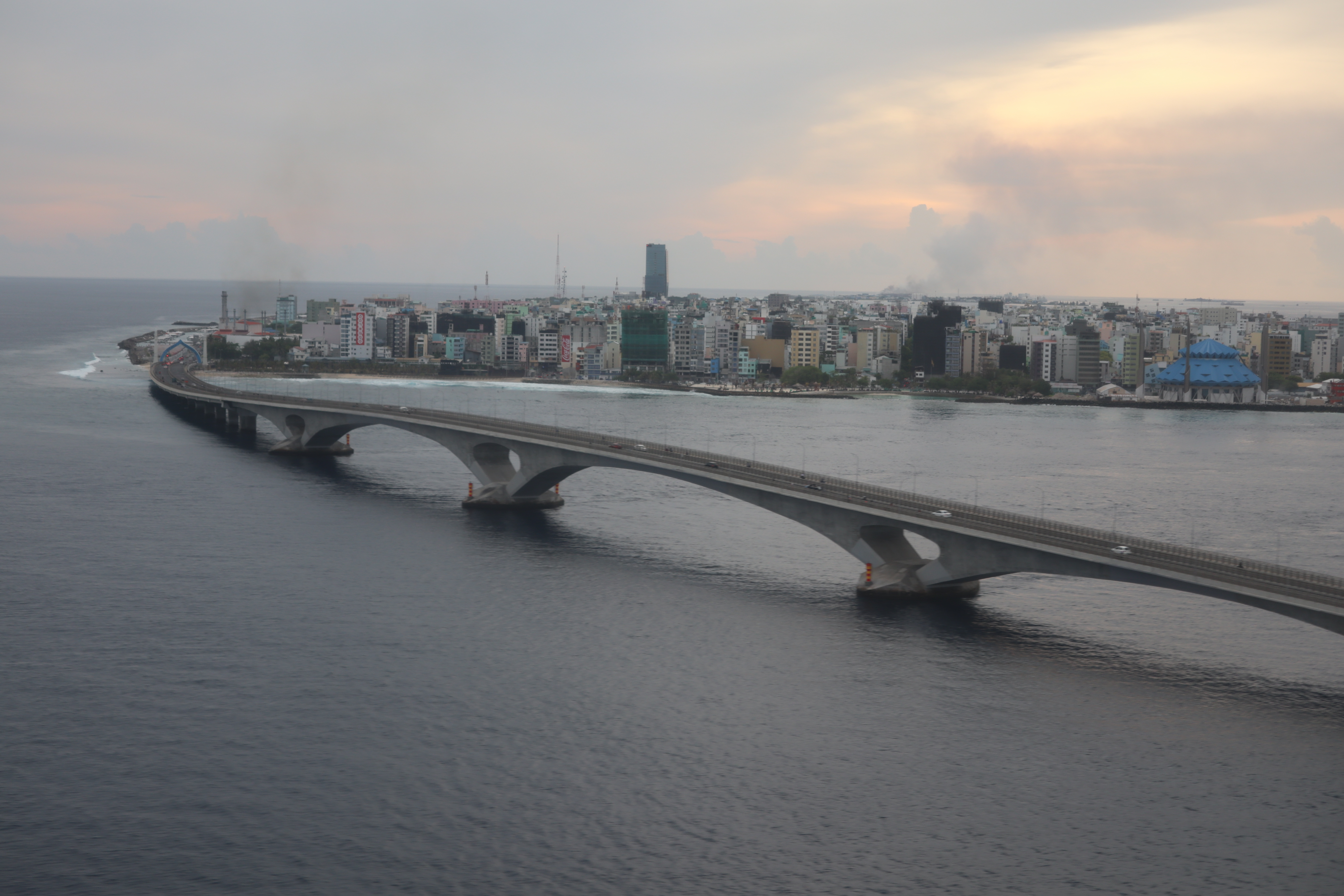
- Aerial view of the bridge
- Coordinates: 4°10′24″N 73°31′28″E
- Carries: Motor vehicles and pedestrians
- Crosses: Gaadhoo Koa (Indian Ocean)
- Locale: Maldives
- Begins: Malé
- Ends: Hulhumalé
- Maintained by: China Harbour Engineering

Characteristics
- Design: Curve bridge
- Total length: 2.1 km
- Width: 20.3 m

History
- Constructed by: China Harbour Engineering Company
- Construction end: 30 August 2018
- Opened: 7 September 2018
- Inaugurated: 30 August 2018

Location
- Interactive map of Sinamalé Bridge

The Sinamalé Bridge (Dhivehi: ސިނަމާލެ ފާލަން; lit. 'China-Malé Bridge') links Malé, the capital of Maldives, to the Hulhulé and Hulhumalé islands. The 2.1 km (1.3 mi) long bridge is the first inter-island bridge in the Maldives and opened for traffic on 30 August 2018. It was originally called as the China-Maldives Friendship Bridge as the bridge was partially funded by the Chinese government. The bridge has four lanes apart from separate lanes for pedestrians.

== History ==
Plans for a bridge connecting the islands of Malé and Hulhulé was first proposed in 2007. The project was finalized in 2014 and was to be constructed with assistance from Government of China. The construction commenced in May 2015, and the bridge was inaugurated on 30 August 2018. It was constructed by China Harbour Engineering Company.

== Finance ==
The bridge was constructed at a cost of US$300 million with a US$100 million grant from the Chinese government, a US$170 million concessional loan from the Export-Import Bank of China, and the remaining US$30 million coming from the Government of Maldives. The bridge was built as a part of China's Belt and Road Initiative, during the presidency of Abdulla Yameen, whose administration, fostered closer ties with China. It was originally called as the China-Maldives Friendship Bridge as the bridge was partially funded by the Chinese government. However, after Yameen's defeat in the 2018 Maldivian presidential election, the new government led by Ibrahim Solih criticized the project's financing by China citing the debt burden.

== Design ==
The bridge connects Malé, the capital of Maldives, to the Hulhulé and Hulhumalé islands. It is the first inter-island bridge in the Maldives. The bridge spans a total length of 2.1 km (1.3 mi) of which 1.39 km (0.86 mi) is over water and is 20.3 m (67 ft) wide. It crosses the open sea channel between Male and Hulhulé, which has a depth of about 50 m (160 ft). The bridge has two lanes for four-wheelers, two lanes for motorcycles, and separate lanes for pedestrians.

== See also ==
- China–Maldives relations
- Hankede Bridge
- Thilamalé Bridge
