= Gadi Buru =

Clock tower in Malé, Maldives

- ގަޑިބުރު
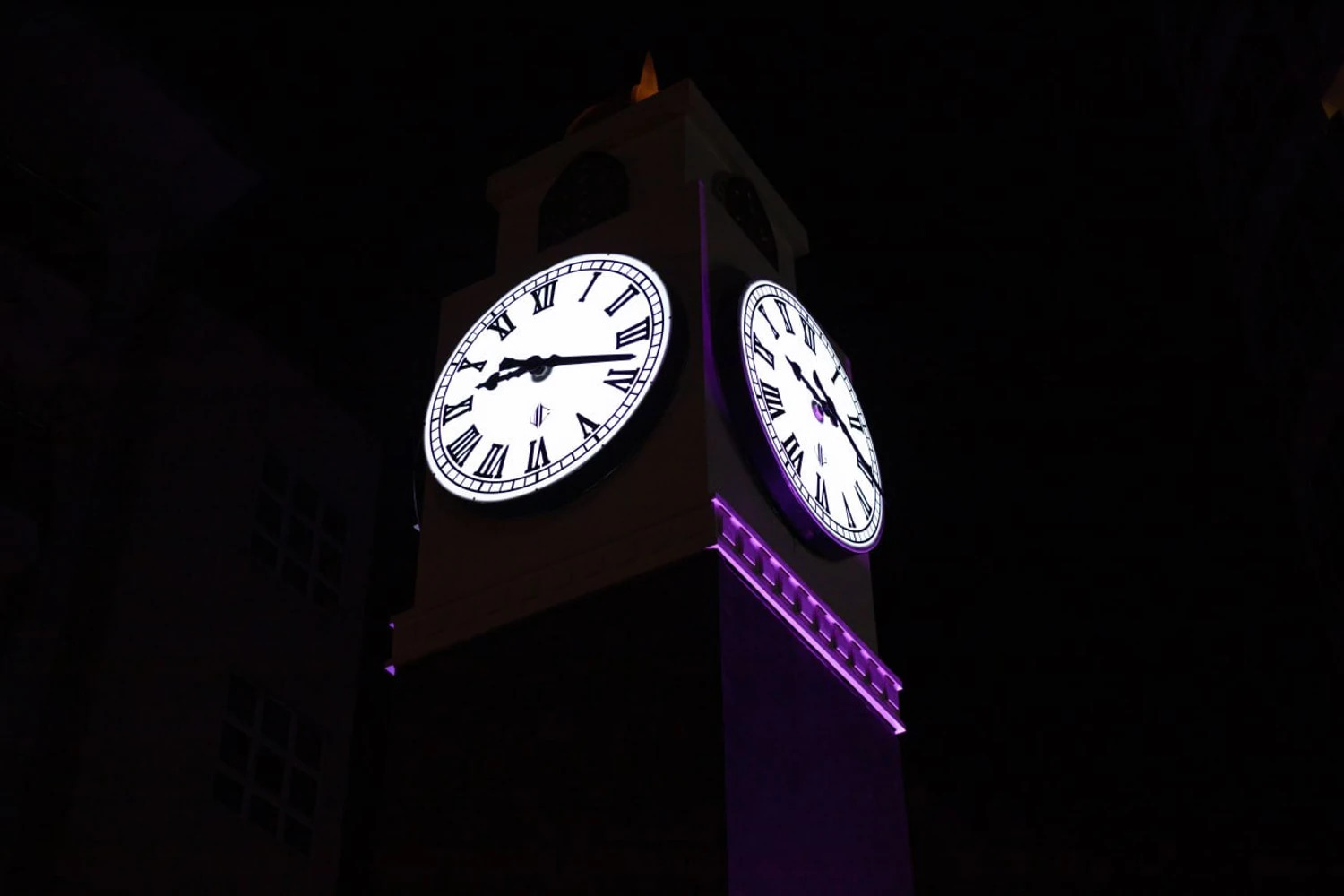
- Alternative names: Bodu Gadi

General information
- Type: Clock tower
- Location: Maafannu, Malé, Maldives
- Coordinates: 4.176130°N 73.506218°E
- Completed: 22 November 1990; 35 years ago
- Rebuilt 18 November 2023; Demolished 2 August 2017

The Gadi Buru (Dhivehi: ގަޑިބުރު) also known as the Bodu Gadi is a clock tower in Malé, the capital of the Maldives. Gadi Buru was built following the Silver Jubilee of Maldivian Independence and was demolished 2017. It was rebuilt and reopened in 2023.

== History ==
The Gadi Buru clock tower was built in 1990 to celebrate the 25th Independence day of the Madives. It was built with the hospitality of Sri Lanka. The tower was developed by the Government of Sri Lanka to signify the relations between Sri Lanka and the Maldives.

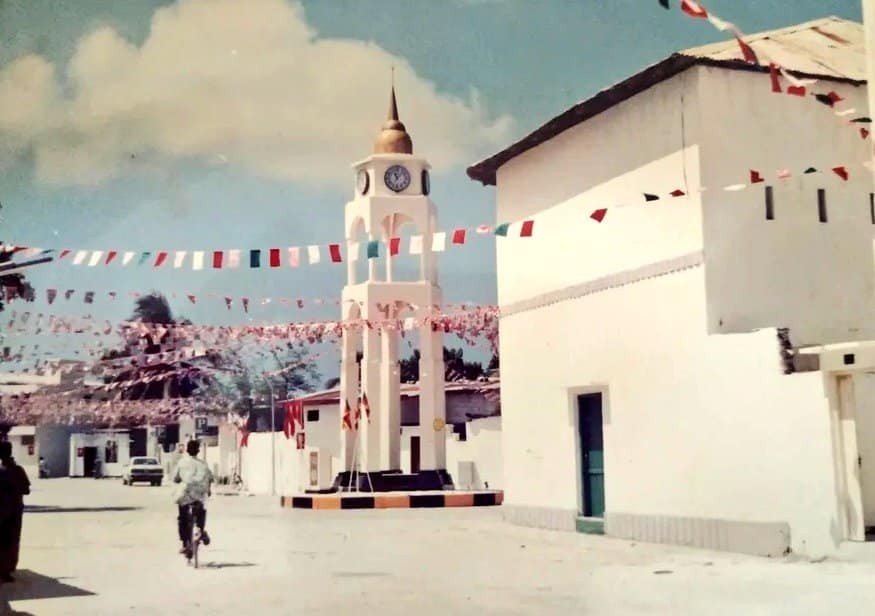
Gadi Buru in the 1990s

In 1990, Sri Lanka generously donated a clock to be installed in a newly constructed tower. Unfortunately, shortly after its installation, the clock ceased functioning and has remained inoperative since then. Despite this, the tower itself has undergone numerous renovations and restorations over the years. However, these efforts have not extended to repairing the clock, which continues to stand as a silent feature of the tower. The clock's persistent state of disrepair contrasts with the continuous upkeep and improvements made to the surrounding structure.

Gadi Buru was demolished by the government on 2 August 2017. The Gadi Buru was rebuilt in November 2023 by Rasheed Carpentry and Construction and the Malé City council.

The reconstruction formed part of the Malé City Council's strategic plan. Its design and development began while Mohamed Muizzu, who later became President of the Maldives, was the city's mayor. Reports described the tower as a historical landmark in the heart of Malé, rebuilt so that it keeps the look of the original while adding modern elements. The most visible addition is a set of LED panels across the structure, which project scenery and other vibrant imagery, so the tower also works as a public display. President Muizzu inaugurated it on the evening of 18 November 2023.
