= Villingili (Villimalé) =

Villingili (ވިލިމާލެ) ވިލިންގިލި Villimalé
- District of Malé City
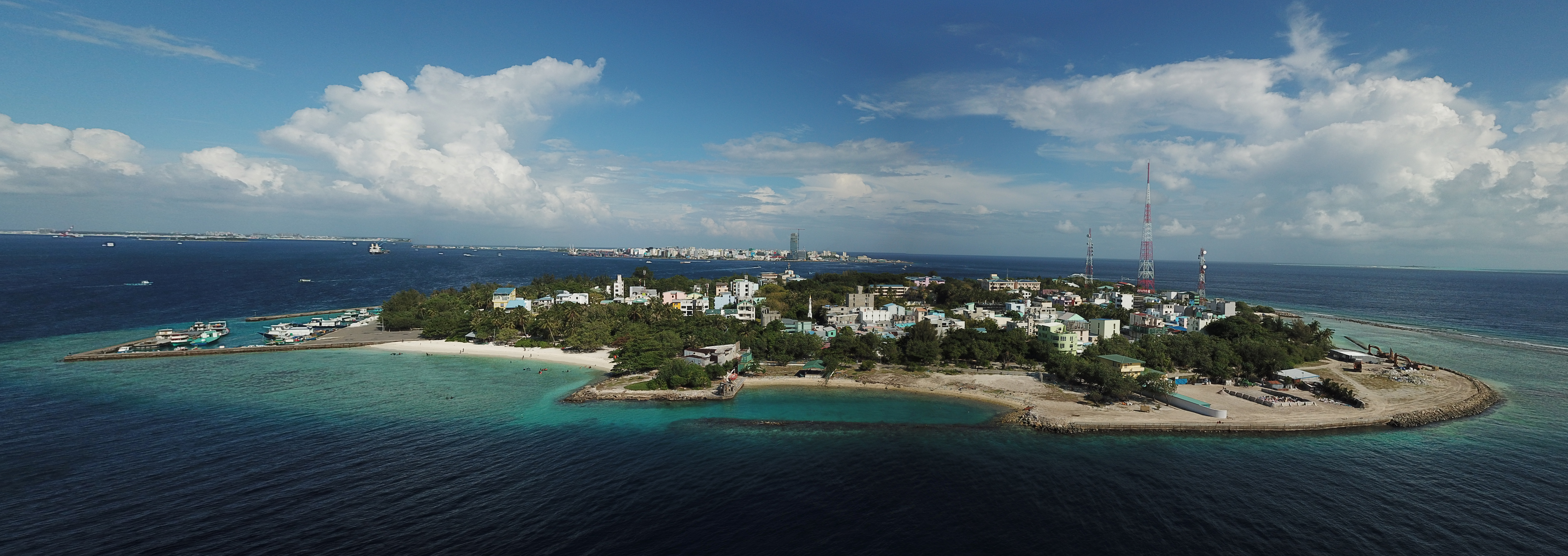
- Aerial view of the whole of Villimalé with Malé in the background,

- Location in Maldives
- Coordinates: 4°10′25″N 73°29′5″E
- Country: Maldives
- Geographic atoll: North Male' Atoll

Government
  - Council: Malé City Council

Area
  - Total: 0.27 km^{2} (0.10 sq mi)

Dimensions
  - Length: 0.8 km (0.50 mi)
  - Width: 0.6 km (0.37 mi)

Population (2022)
  - Total: 6,755
  - Density: 25,000/km^{2} (65,000/sq mi)
- Time zone: UTC+05:00 (MVT)

Villingili, administratively known as Villimalé, is an island in the North Male Atoll and is considered the fifth district of Malé City. It lies about two kilometres (1.2 mi) west of Malé island.

The island is reachable via local ferry service that operates 24 hours between Malé and Villimalé. The Thilamalé Bridge, which is scheduled to open in September 2026, will connect Villingili to Malé, Gulhifalhu and Thilafushi.

== Location within Malé City ==
Villimalé is to the west of Malé Island:

== History ==
Villingili was historically inhabited and was often burned and looted by frustrated Malabar pirates who could not penetrate the defenses of Malé. In 1961, the original residents of Villingili were resettled in Hulhulé to free up agricultural land near Malé. A prison was built on the island in 1962, and a resort was opened in 1973.

Villimalé used to be a resort earlier before it became a residential island. In fact it became the second resort to start operations in Maldives, after the first resort in Maldives, Kurumba became over-booked.

Between 2010 and 2016 an adolescent drug rehabilitation centre was operated near the public beach of Villimalé.

== Tourism in Villimalé ==
Villimalé currently attracts a lot of local visitors and popular holiday destination among the residents of Malé and Hulhumalé, specially during the weekends. There are several hotels and guest houses in Villimalé that also attract tourists from abroad.

Villimalé is also home to Liquid Water Sports, one of the few hydro sports hubs in Maldives. It actively promotes flyboarding and is a Zapata certified Professional FlyBoarding Partner.

== Image gallery ==
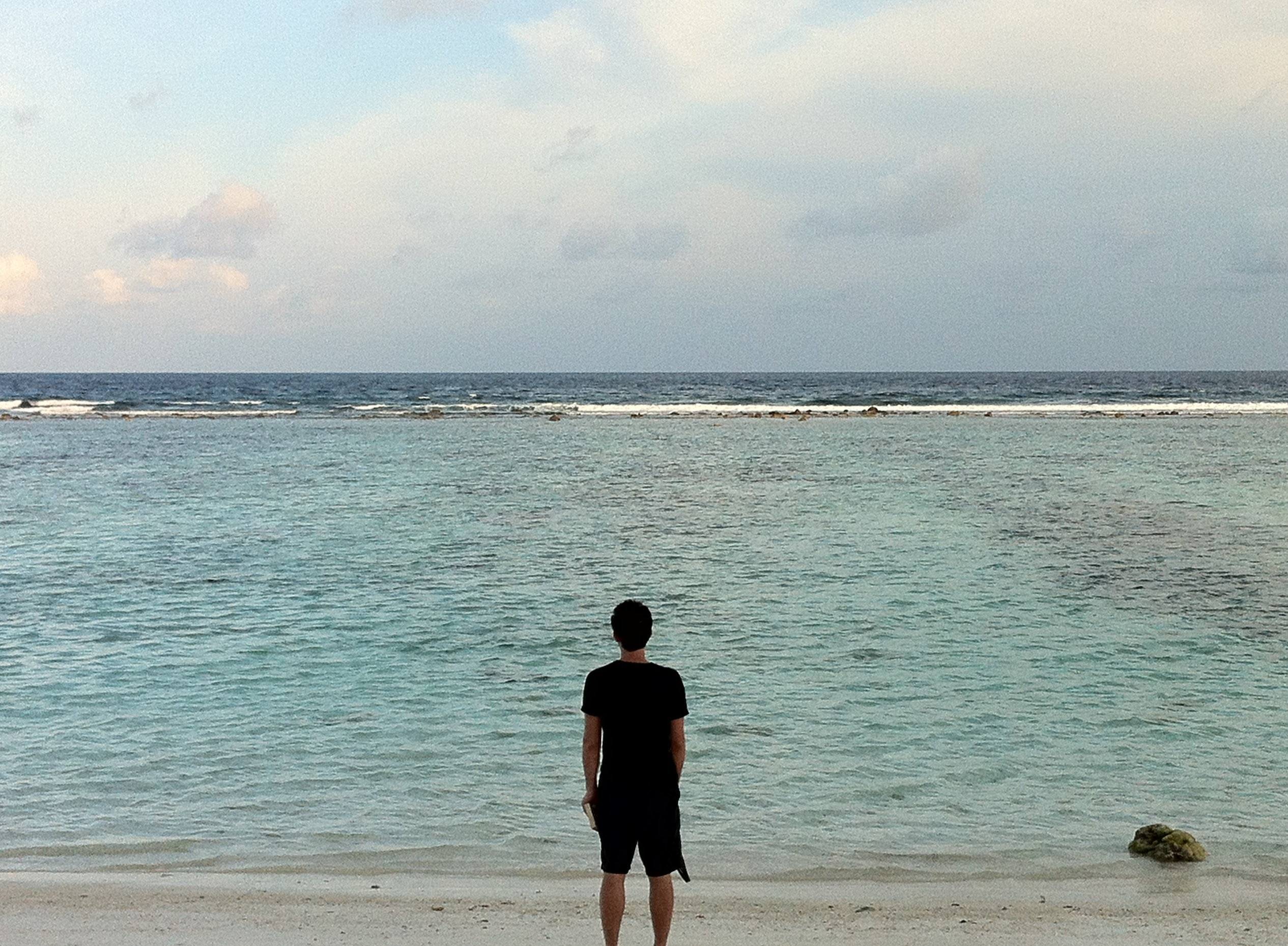
A View of the Laccadive Sea from Villimalé
