= Gulhifalhu =

District of the Maldives

Gulhifalhu ގުޅިފަޅު
- District of Malé City
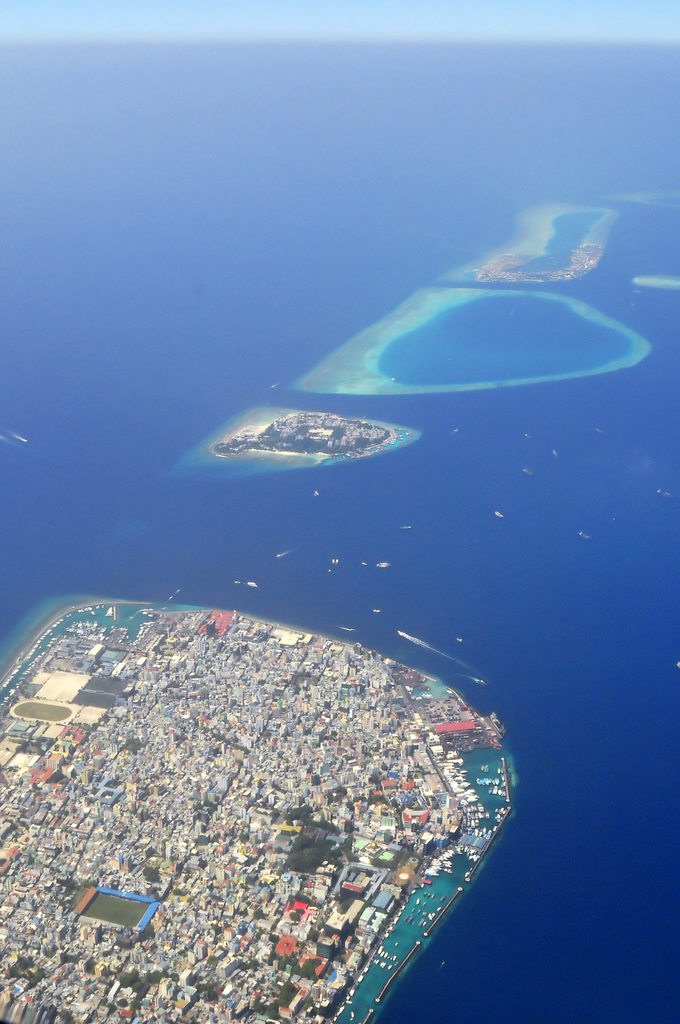
- Gulhifalhu lagoon (2nd from top) in 2009, prior to reclamation. Thilafushi is visible above, Villimalé below and central Malé at the bottom.

- Location in Maldives
- Coordinates: 4.18°N 73.47°E
- Country: Maldives
- Geographic atoll: North Male Atoll

Government
  - Council: Malé City Council

Population (2025)
  - Total: 0
- Time zone: UTC+05:00 (MVT)

Gulhifalhu (Dhivehi: ގުޅިފަޅު), also Gulhi Falhu, is an artificial island and a district of Malé City, Maldives. Located between Villingili (Villimalé) and Thilafushi, Gulhifalhu will be connected to its neighbors and central Malé (6 km away) by the Thilamalé Bridge, which is scheduled for completion in 2027.

== Land reclamation ==
Previously designated uninhabitable, Gulhifalhu has undergone a massive land reclamation project. Started in May 2020 and completed in July 2024, the 3 billion rufiyaa project by Boskalis involved dredging and pumping 18 million cubic meters of sand to fill in the lagoon of Gulhifalhu to create 150 hectares of usable land.

The primary rationale for land reclamation at Gulhifalhu was to build a new port that can take over the existing Port of Malé, creating space for redevelopment. The island will also host manufacturing, warehousing and distribution facilities.

In 2018, President Abdulla Yameen Abdul Gayoom announced that Gulhifalhu would host a "mega housing project" dubbed Villimalé 2, after the neighboring island of Villimalé. As of 2025, 3,640 plots have been allocated for additional housing.

== Controversy ==
Both the reclamation and the housing plan for the island have been controversial. The land reclamation contract was awarded without a formal tendering process, six months before the completion of an environmental impact assessment that revealed "potential irreversible environmental damage". The reclamation destroyed a protected marine area known as Hans Hass Place or Kiki Reef, resulting in the permanent loss of marine habitat and coral reefs. In 2021, environmental activist Humaidha Abdul Ghafoor filed a case against the Maldivian Environmental Protection Agency and other government agencies, winning a High Court injunction to stop the project. However, the injunction was overturned by the Supreme Court in 2024.

According to the Maldives Independent, a technical analysis commissioned by the Malé City Council described the plan for the housing project as "engineered for urban disaster", with 41,008 units housing 150,000 people, exceeding the density of Malé itself. The plan has only 10 schools for 45,000 students and allocates only 0.85 m^{2} of green space per person.

Sentinel-2 satellite image timelapse from 2020 to 2025, showing land reclamation on Gulhifalhu. Produced with Copernicus Browser
