= Maldivian Medical Association =

Medical organization

- Maldivian Medical Association
- Formation: 16 October 2005; 21 years ago
- Location: Maldives
- Members: 200+ (2022)
- Website: mma.org.mv

The Maldivian Medical Association was founded on 16 October 2005 in the Maldives as the first independent body representing Maldives medical doctors. It aims to improve medical services and to develop professionalism amongst Maldivian doctors. Its current president is Aminath Zeyba Ahmed, and the vice president is Asadh Mohamed Saeed.

The association had conducted various programmes to raise awareness for speeding and took measures to address medicine shortages.
