= Hankede Bridge =

Bridge connecting Gaukendi and Maradhoo in the Maldives

Hankede Bridge ހަންކެޑެ ބްރިޖު
- Coordinates: 0°39′27″S 73°06′36″E
- Carries: Motor vehicles and Pedestrians
- Locale: Maldives
- Maintained by: AFCONS

Characteristics
- Total length: 1.4 km

History
- Constructed by: AFCONS
- Construction start: 24 October 2021
- Construction end: 11 August 2024
- Inaugurated: 1 February 2025

Location
- Interactive map of Hankede Bridge

The Hankede Bridge (Dhivehi: ހަންކެޑެ ބްރިޖު) is a bridge connecting Maradhoo and Gaukendi in Addu City, Maldives.

== History ==
The bridge was constructed under a $800 million dollar line of credit from the Exim Bank of India. The project was awarded to Afcons Infrastructure.

Construction was officially started by Afcons on 24 October 2021. The bridge was officially handed over to the Maldivian government by India's External Affairs Minister S. Jaishankar.

On 1 February 2025, the bridge was officially opened to the public.

== Opening delay ==
Controversy arose after the signing ceremony after the government had announced several opening days but later backtracked. Addu City Mayor Ali Nizar urged the Ministry of Construction and Infrastructure to take responsibility and open the bridge for public use.
