= Thilafushi =

District of Malé City in the Maldives

- District of Malé
- Location in Maldives
- Coordinates: 4°11′N 73°26′E
- Country: Maldives
- Administrative atoll: Kaafu Atoll
- Distance to Malé: 6.85 km (4.26 mi)

Dimensions
  - Length: 3.50 km (2.17 mi)
  - Width: 0.20 km (0.12 mi)
- Time zone: UTC+05:00 (MST)

Thilafushi (Dhivehi: ތިލަފުށި) is an artificial island in the Maldives, created by a government decision in 1991 as a municipal landfill situated to the west of the capital, Malé. It is located between Kaafu Atoll's Giraavaru and Gulhifalhu.

== History ==
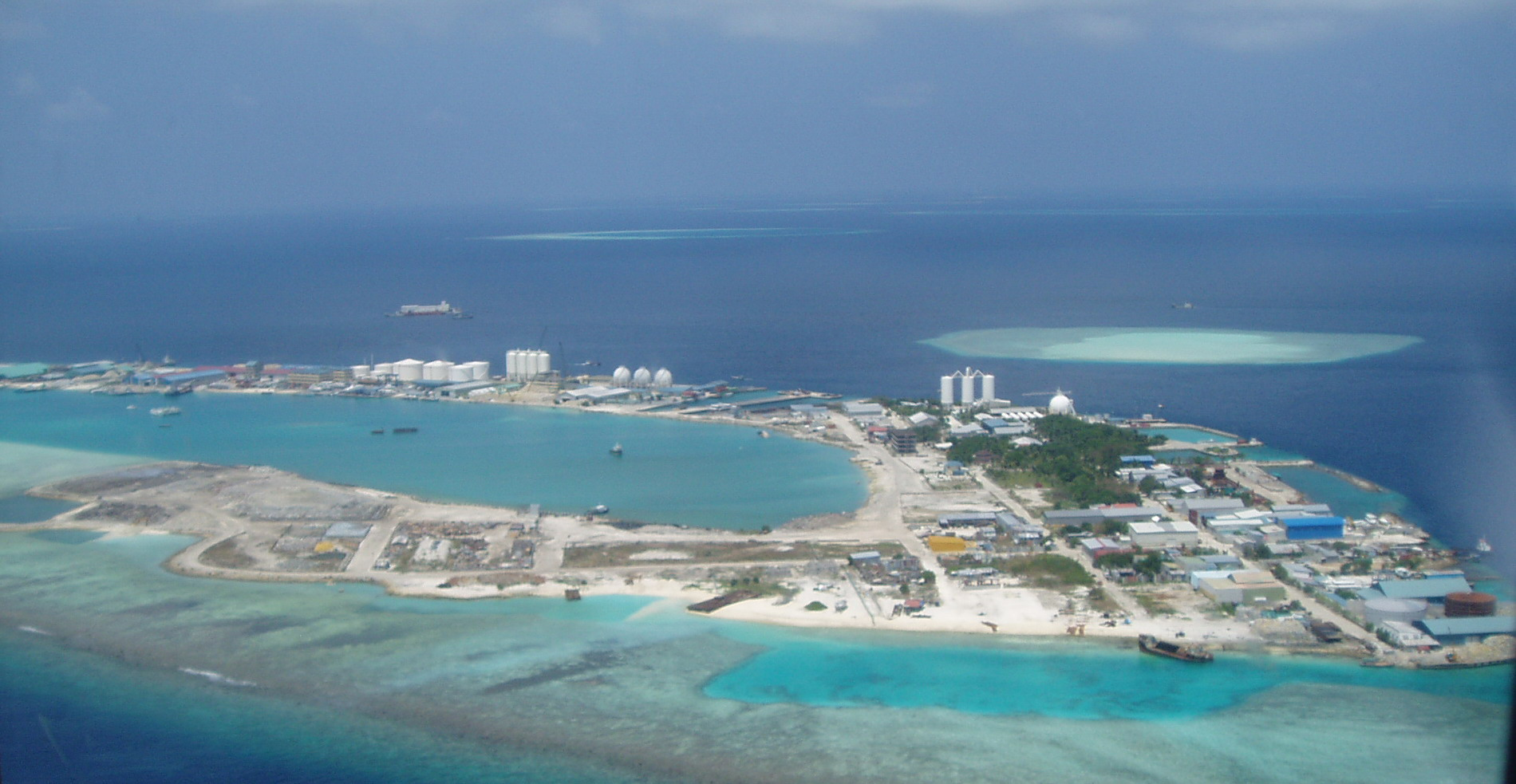
Thilafushi

Thilafushi was originally a lagoon called Thilafalhu, with a length of 7 km and a width of 200 metres at its shallowest regions. It came into existence following a series of discussions and efforts to resolve Malé's garbage predicament during the early 1990s. The decision to reclaim Thilafalhu as a landfill was made on 5 December 1991.

Thilafushi received its first load of garbage from Malé on 7 January 1992. Operations began with one landing craft, four heavy trucks, two excavators, and a single wheel loader.

During its early years of waste disposal operations, pits (also known as cells) with a volume of 37,500 ft^{3} (1060 m^{3}) were dug, after which the sand obtained from the excavation was used to construct walled enclosures around the internal perimeter of the cells. Waste received from Malé was deposited into the pits, which were topped off with a layer of construction debris and then uniformly levelled with white sand. Initially, there was no segregation of the waste, since it had to be disposed of immediately due to mass accumulation.

== Industrialization ==
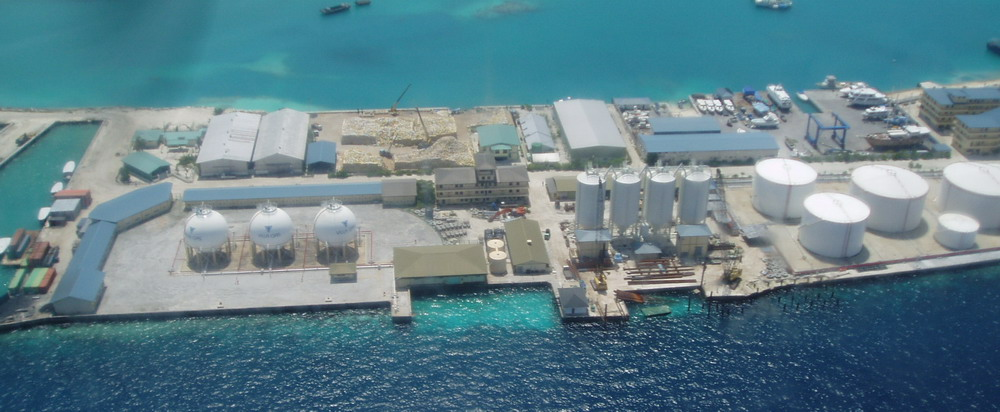
Thilafushi-2, area with heaviest industrialization

Thilafushi has a landmass of more than 4.6 million ft.^{2} (0.43 km²). Its speedy growth was observed by the government, and in November 1997, it was decided that land was to be leased to entrepreneurs interested in acquiring it for industrial purposes. Initially, there were 22 leaseholders. This number has since doubled, resulting in more than 1.2 million square feet (0.11 km² or 27.5 acres) of land being used. An area of 0.2 km², known as Thilafushi-2, has been reclaimed in order to provide space for more heavy industries.

The major industrial activities on the island are boat manufacturing, cement packing, methane gas bottling, and large-scale warehousing. The government has also been planning a 50-ton incinerator facility.

In March 2015, the Maldivian government decided to relocate the central commercial port from Malé to Thilafushi. However, the deal was not completed.

== Environmental issues ==
Mountains of waste piled up on the "garbage island" of Thilafushi

Environmentalists have said that more than 330 tonnes of rubbish are brought to Thilafushi each day, mostly from Malé. In 2005, it was estimated that 31,000 truckloads of garbage were transported to Thilafushi annually, where they were dumped in large piles and eventually used to reclaim land and increase the size of the island. So much is being deposited that the island is growing at a rate of one square metre per day.

According to 2012 official statistics, a single tourist produced 3.5 kg of garbage a day, twice as much as someone from Malé and five times more than anyone from the rest of the Maldives archipelago. Altogether, that comes to "300 to 400 tons of trash" dumped on the island every day, according to Shina Ahmed, administration manager of the Thilafushi Corporation that runs the island.

Ali Rilwan, an environmentalist in Malé, said that "used batteries, asbestos, lead and other potentially hazardous waste mixed with the municipal solid wastes [are] being put into the water. Although it is a small fraction of the total, these wastes are a source of toxic heavy metals and it is an increasingly serious ecological and health problem in the Maldives". Bluepeace, the main ecological movement of the Maldives, has described the island as a "toxic bomb".

After reports of illegal dumping surfaced, management was transferred to the Malé city council to clear up confusion regarding who was responsible for the waste. The council signed a contract in 2011 with the Indian-based company Tatva Global Renewable Energy to rehabilitate the island and manage the waste problem. However, the deal was never implemented, due to bureaucracy and political interference; it was ultimately cancelled.

== Transport ==
The Thilamalé Bridge, scheduled for completion in 2027, will connect Thilafushi with Malé.

== See also ==
- Waste management
- Natural environment
