= Malé =

Capital of the Maldives

Malé މާލެ (Dhivehi)
- Capital city
- Malé City
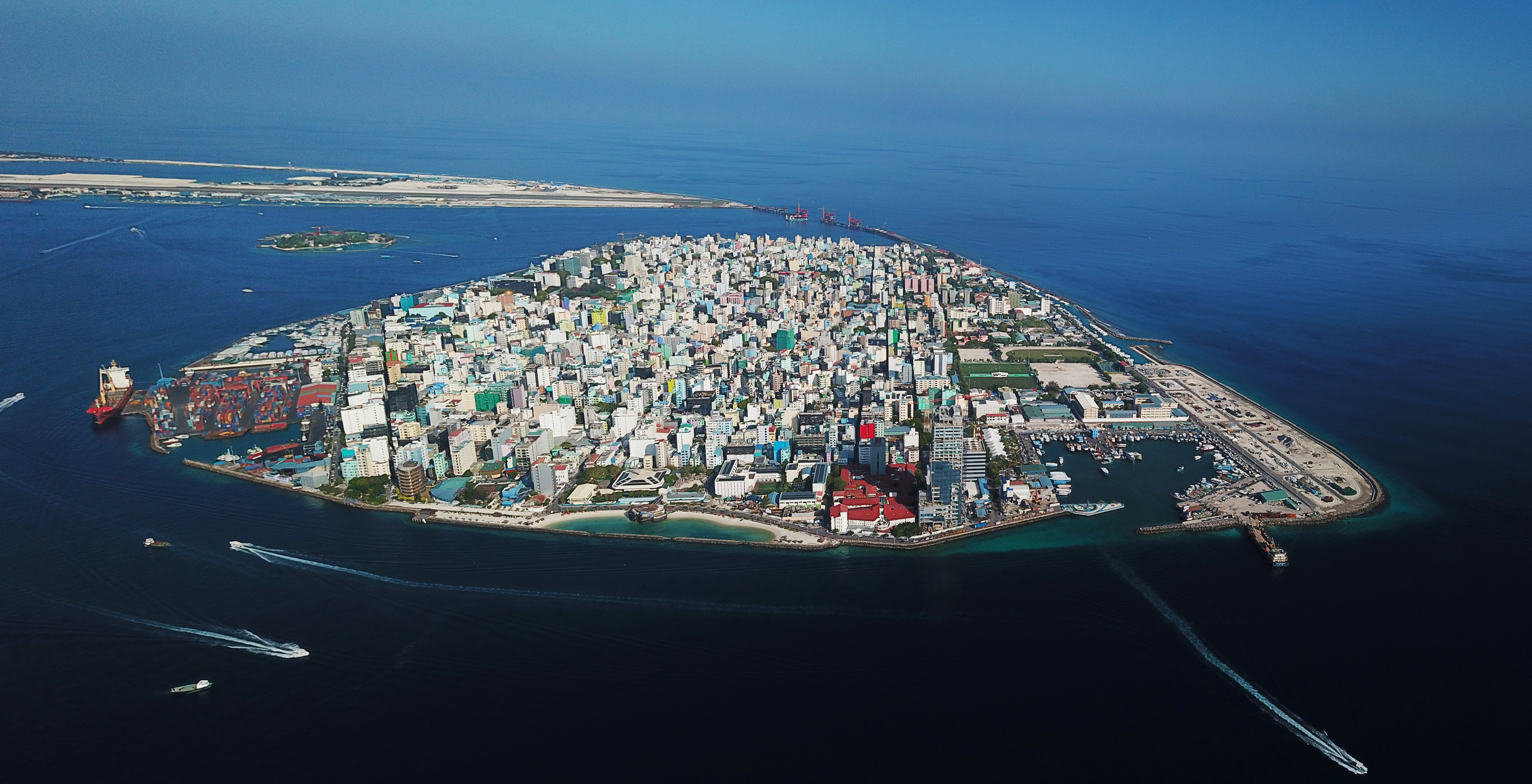
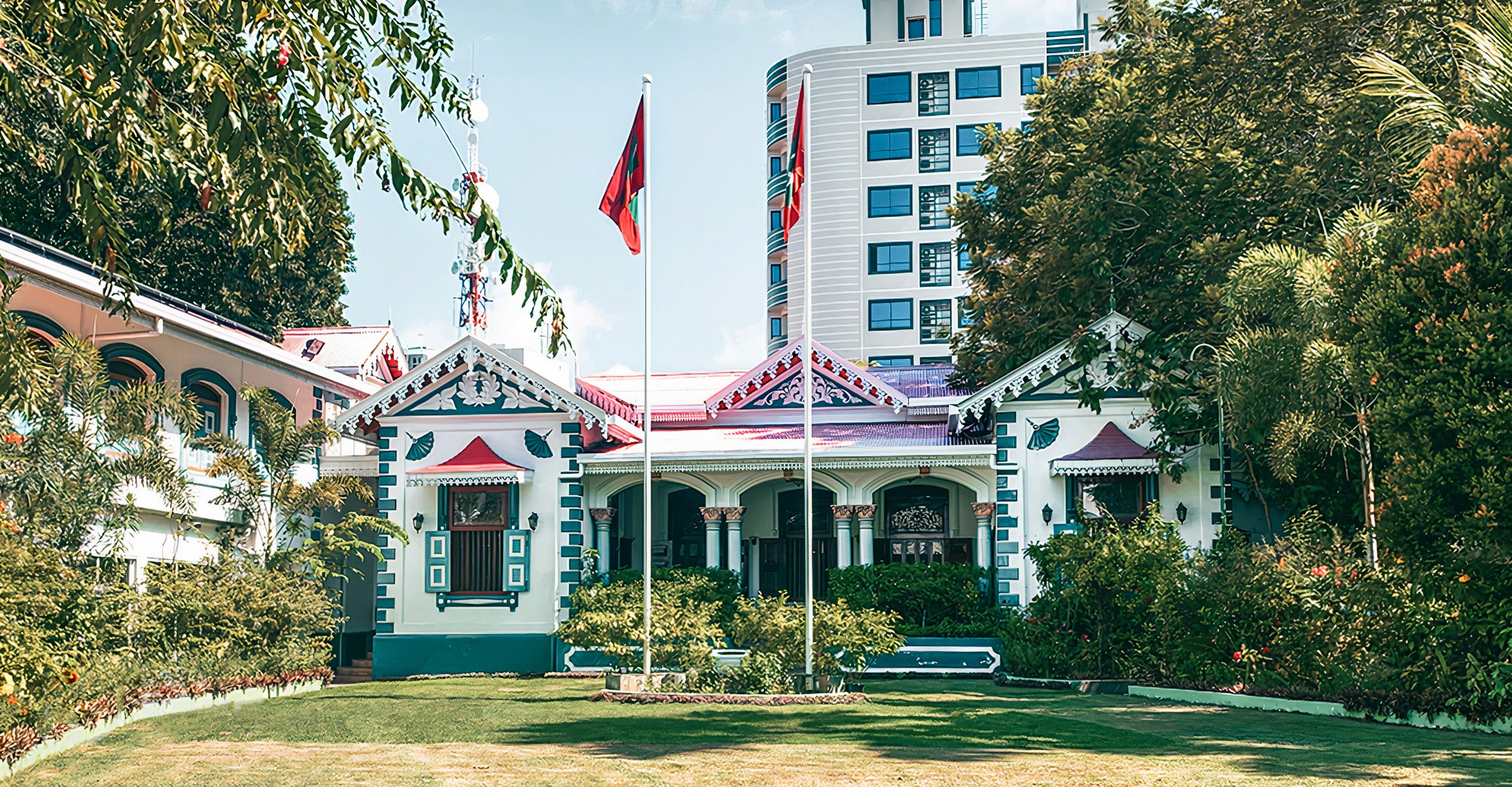
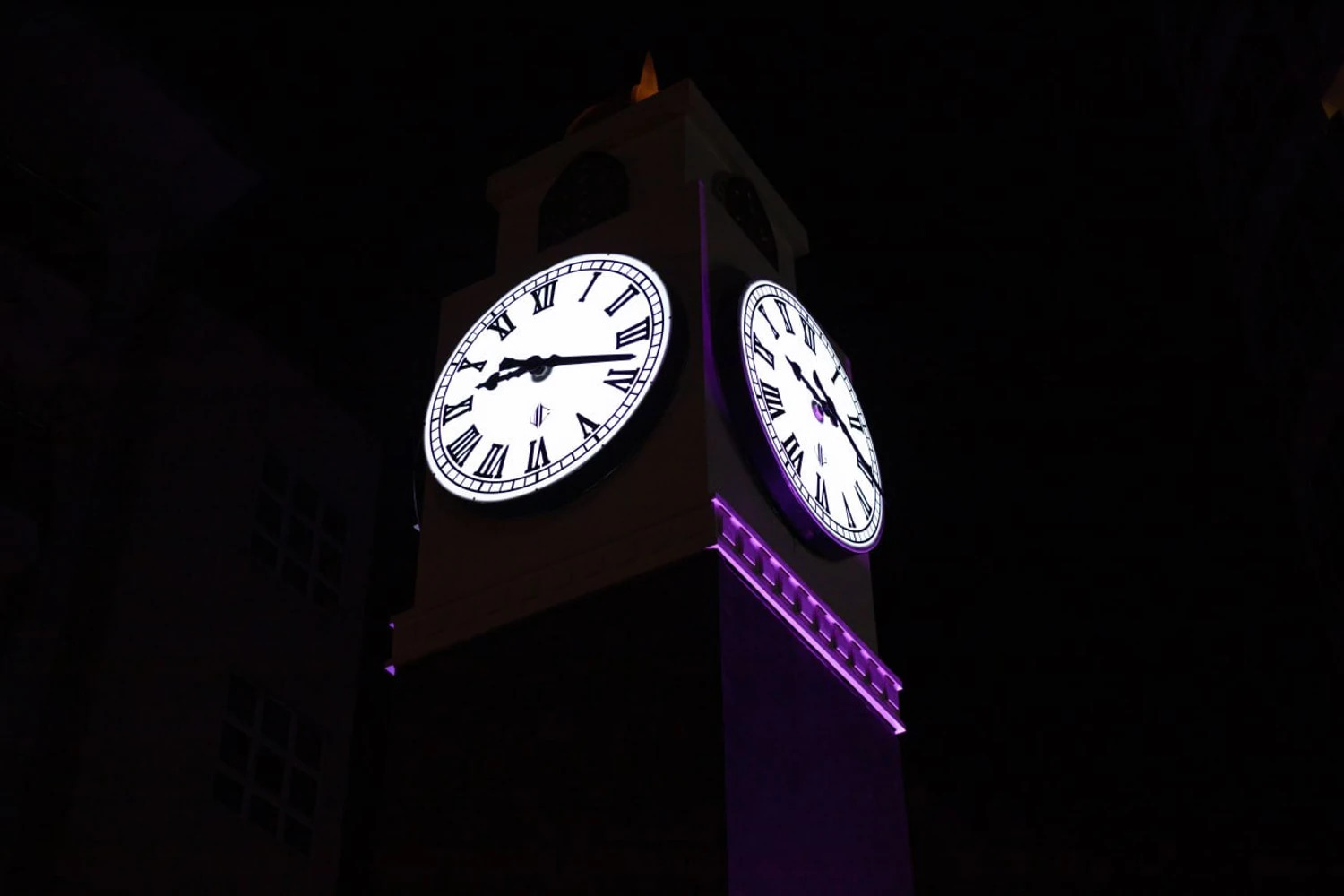
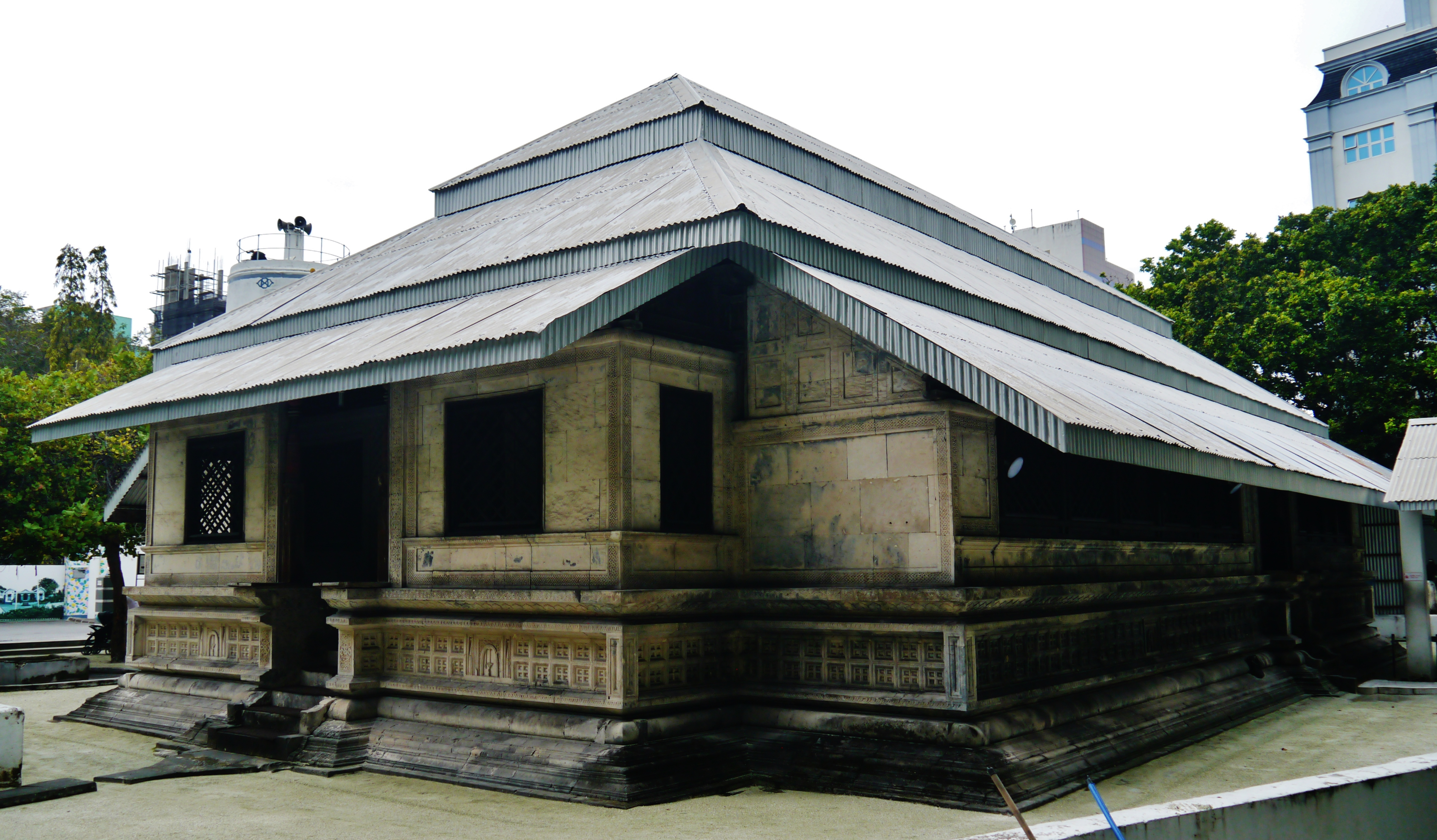
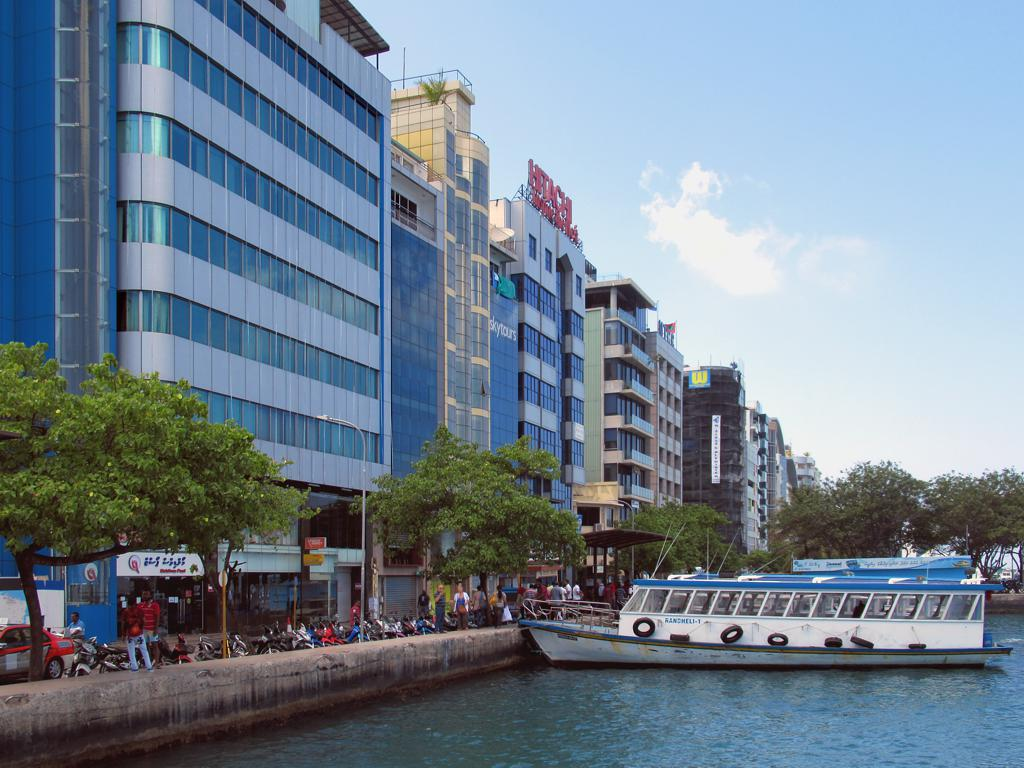
- Aerial view of Malé Muliaage Gadi Buru Friday Mosque Malé Waterfront
- Interactive map of Malé
- Location of Malé in the Maldives Malé (Asia)
- Coordinates: 4°10′31″N 73°30′32″E
- Country: Maldives
- Geographic atoll: North Malé Atoll
- Established: 5th century

Government
  - Type: Mayor-council
  - Body: Malé City Council
  - Mayor: Adam Azim (MDP)

Area
  - Capital city: 11.22 km^{2} (4.33 sq mi)
  - Urban: 1.95 km^{2} (0.75 sq mi)
  - Metro: 9.27 km^{2} (3.58 sq mi)
- Metro area also includes Hulhulé and Hulhumalé.
- Elevation: 2.4 m (7.9 ft)

Population (2022)
  - Capital city: 211,908
  - Density: 111,531/km^{2} (288,860/sq mi)
- Time zone: UTC+5 (MVT)
- Assigned Letter: T
- Area code(s): 331, 332, 333, 334
- ISO 3166 code: MV-MLE
- Website: malecity.gov.mv

Malé (Note: /ˈmɑːleɪ/, Dhivehi: މާލެ [ˈmaːle]) is the capital and most populous city of the Maldives. With a population of 211,908 in 2022 within its administrative area and coterminous geographical area of 1.9 square kilometres (0.73 sq mi), Malé is one of the most densely populated cities in the world. The city is geographically located in the southern edge of North Malé Atoll (Kaafu Atoll). Administratively, the city consists of a central island, an airport island, and five other islands presided over by the Malé City Council.

Traditionally it was the King's Island, from where the ancient royal dynasties ruled and where the palace was located. The city was then called Mahal. Formerly it was a walled city surrounded by fortifications and gates (doroshi). The Royal Palace (Gan'duvaru) was destroyed along with the picturesque forts (koshi) and bastions (buruzu) when the city was remodelled under President Ibrahim Nasir's rule in the aftermath of the abolition of the monarchy in 1968. However, some buildings remained, namely, the Malé Friday Mosque. In the last few decades, the island has been considerably expanded in size through land reclamation. Over the years, Malé has been the center of political protests and milestone events.

Islam has played a central role in the city's history since 1153 CE, when the Maldives converted from Buddhism to Islam under the influence of North African traders and missionaries. This religious shift deeply influenced Malé's cultural and architectural identity, visible today in the form of mosques such as the 17th-century Hukuru Miskiy (Friday Mosque), built from coral stone and considered one of the oldest mosques in the country. Over the centuries, Malé has remained not only the capital but also the symbolic and historical core of the Maldives.

== Overview ==
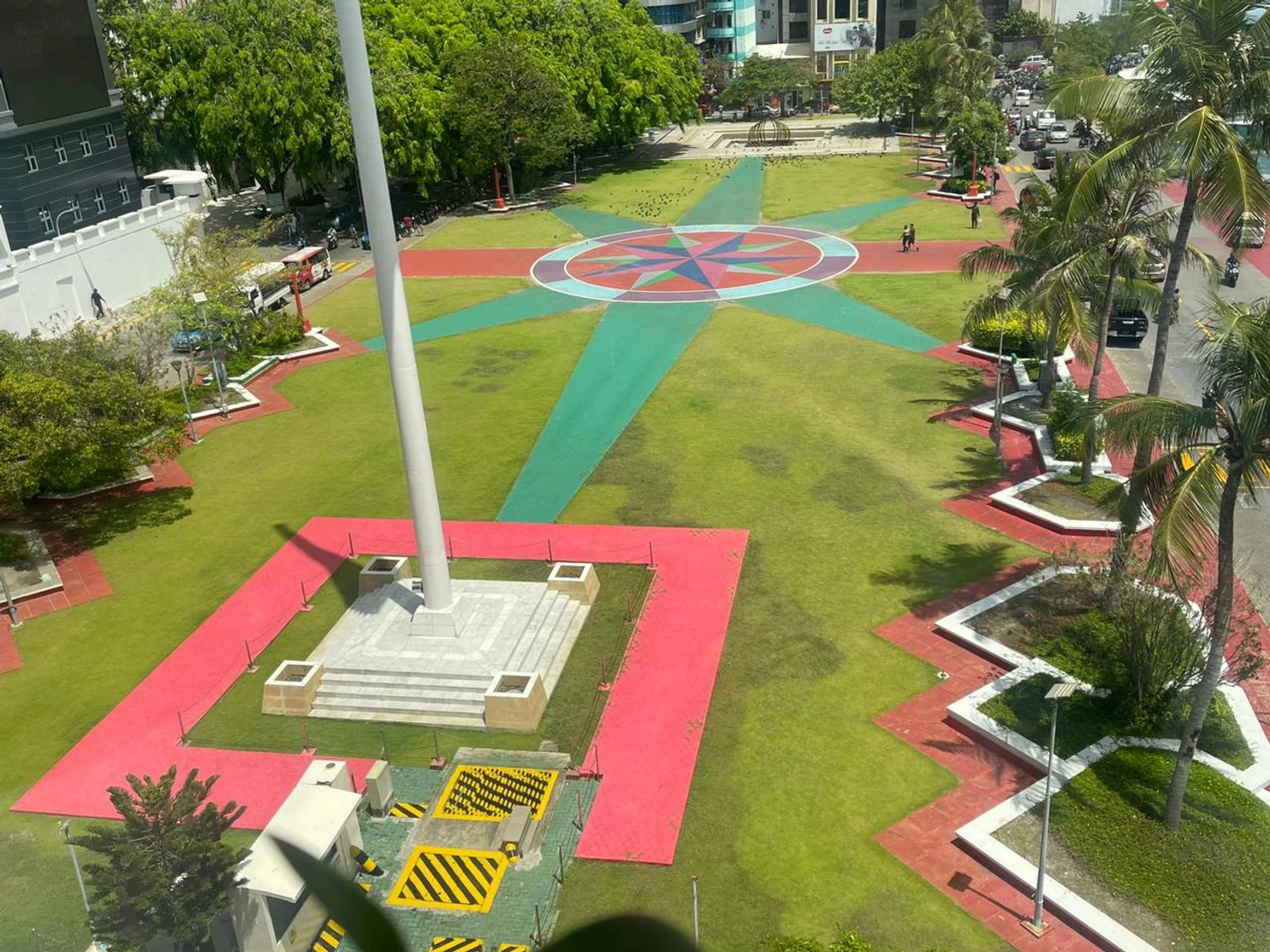
This is one of the main "Maizaan's" or squares in Malé city where the National flag bastion stands. The Republic Square or Jumhooree Maidhaan is one of the main landmarks of the city - in front of the Bandaara Koshi or Defence force headquarters

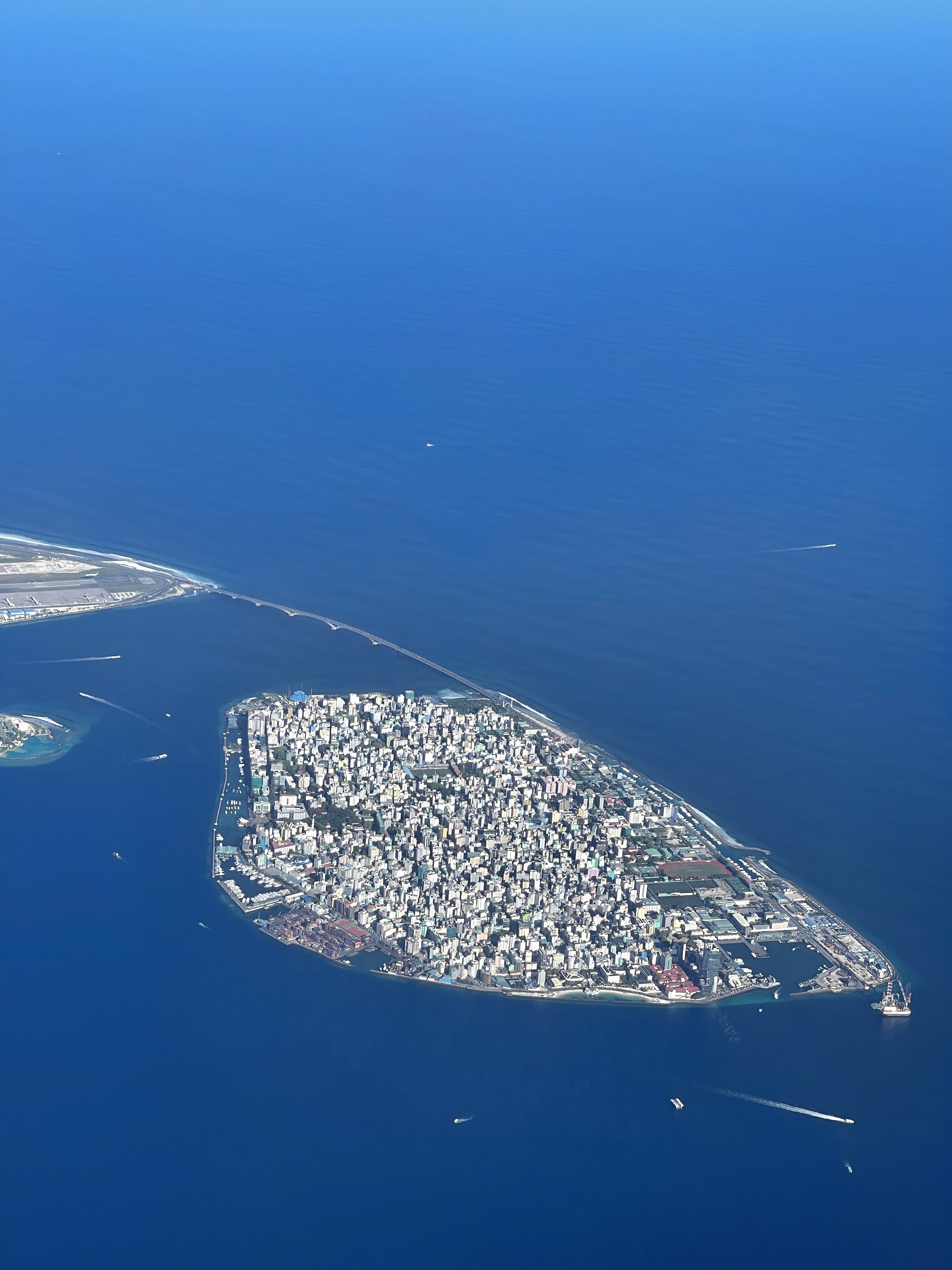
Malé in 2022, with a bridge to the airport and Hulhumalé

Although Malé is geographically located in Kaafu Atoll, administratively it is not considered part of it.

=== Islands of Malé City ===
1. Malé (Central Island)
2. Hulhulé (Airport Island)
3. Hulhumalé
4. Villimalé
5. Gulhifalhu
6. Thilafushi
7. Giraavarufalhu

The central part of the city is formed by the island of Malé. Six more islands form part of the city which includes Hulhulé, Hulhumalé, Villimalé, Gulhifalhu, Thilafushi and Giraavarufalhu.

A commercial harbour is located on the central island and serves as the heart of all commercial activities in the country. Velana International Airport is located on the Island of Hulhulé.

The central island is heavily urbanised, with the built-up area taking up essentially its entire landmass. Slightly less than one-third of the nation's population lives in the capital city, and the population has increased from 20,000 people in 1987 to 100,000 people in 2006. Many Maldivians and foreign workers living in other parts of the country find themselves in occasional short-term residence on the island since it is the centre of administration and bureaucracy. Most of the population of Malé live in small houses or apartment complexes, often shared with external family or roommates. This led to the development of Hulhumalé and the extension to Phase 2.

The Indian expatriate community in the Maldives stands as the second-largest, comprising around 27,000 individuals. Among them, a substantial portion consists of construction workers, doctors, nurses, health professionals, and teachers, who play vital roles in the Maldivian infrastructure, healthcare, and education sectors. Additionally, Indian and Bangladeshi nationals contribute significantly as skilled workers, alongside a sizable presence of unskilled laborers, as well as other professionals and members of the business community.

== History ==
The whole island group, the Maldives, is named after its capital. The word "Maldives" means "the islands (dives) of Malé".

The first settlers in the Maldivian islands were Dravidian people who arrived from the neighboring shores of the modern Indian subcontinent and coastal Ceylon. Comparative studies of Maldivian linguistic, oral, and other cultural traditions, in addition to folklore, point to a strong Dravidian influence on Maldivian society, centered in Malé, from ancient times. The Giraavaru people of Giraavaru claim descent from the first Tamil settlers of the Maldives.

It is said that early Tamil settlers called the islands Maalaitivu, which means Garland Islands or Chain Islands. Early records also indicate that the island was called "Athamana Huraa" before being named Malé. According to regional lore, Giraavaru fishermen used to go regularly to a certain large sandbank (finolhu) at the southern end of their atoll to clean tuna fish after a good catch. Owing to a large amount of tuna fish offal and blood, the waters around that sandbank looked like a big pool of blood ("maa ley gandeh": "maa" from the Sanskrit मह "maha", meaning big, and "lē" blood). Traditionally the first inhabitants of the Maldives, which include the Giravaru people, did not have kings. They lived in a simple society and were ruled by local headmen.

However, one day, a prince from the subcontinent called Koimala arrived at the Malé Atoll sailing from the North on a big ship. The people of Giraavaru spotted his vessel from afar and welcomed him. They allowed Prince Koimala to settle on that large sandbank amid the waters tainted with fish blood. Trees were planted on the sandbank and it is said that the first tree that grew on it was the papaya tree. (However, this could refer to any tree that bears edible fruit as the archaic Dhivehi word, and Mahal word in modern times, for fruit (falhoa), was the same as that for the papaya.) As time went by, the local islanders accepted the rule of this Northern Prince. A palace was built and the island was formally named Maa-le (Malé), while the nearest island was named Hulhu-le.

The names of the main four wards or divisions of Malé Island are said to have been given by the original Giraavaru fishermen: Maafannu from maa (big) and fannu (a place where a village path meets the sea), Henveiru from en-beyru (out where fishermen got their bait), Galolhu from galu-olhu (stone groove) and, Macchangolhi from mathi-angolhi (windward path-fork).

In early foreign sources, Malé was called Ambria or Mahl. For the Maldivians, it was Fura Malé, i.e. "Malé the Pre-Eminent".

When Ibn Battuta traveled to Malé in 1343 (in Arabic: المَحَل, romanized: al-Maḥal thus the entire Maldivian islands were ذِيبَةُ المَحَل Dhībat-ul-Maḥal), he provided a rather extensive description of the city as well as the Islands of the Maldives overall. He mentioned that the Queen, Rehendhi Khadeeja, had a residence in Malé, which from its description may be assimilated to the same palace of the later sultan rulers, in the centre of the island. Within the palace compounds, several pits contained stores of cowrie shells, ready to be traded. Ibn Battuta also mentioned several mosques, built in wood.

Malé was fortified in the 17th century by the sultan Muhammad Imaduddin, who built walls on the north, east, and west sides of the island. An inner harbour was used by fishing vessels and small dhonis, while larger vessels had to anchor in the outer harbour, between the islands of Vilingili and Hulhule. The island covered less than one square mile in size and was surrounded by a shallow lagoon.

Malé had 2,148 inhabitants in 1888, but population growth soon led to the search for new spaces for housing. The old forts and decrepit walls were dismantled in 1925–1927 under the reign of Muhammad Shamsuddeen III, to be rebuilt on a smaller scale. Roads were also widened and straightened. Former large cemeteries had also been cleared out, to achieve more housing space.

The Royal Palace (Gan'duvaru) was destroyed along with the picturesque forts (koshi) and bastions (buruzu) when the city was remodelled under President Ibrahim Nasir's rule in the aftermath of the abolition of the monarchy in 1968. Only the National Museum building, the residence of the last sultan, as well as the Malé Friday Mosque, remain. Malé's residents soon grew to 11,453 by 1967 and 29,522 by 1977. To cater to the growing population, by 1986 the shallow lagoon around Malé was reclaimed.

The most revered place in Malé is the Medhu Ziyaaraiy, across the street from the Malé Friday Mosque: the tomb of Abu al-Barakat Yusuf al-Barbari, considered to have converted the Maldives to Islam in 1153.

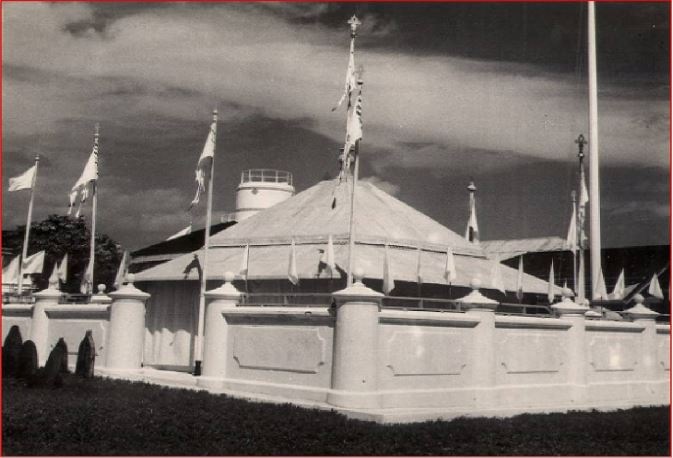
Malé, Medhu Ziyaaraiy, 1958

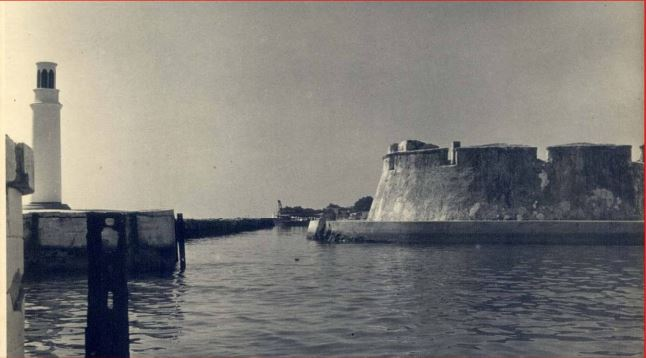
Malé, Bodu Buruzu, 1960

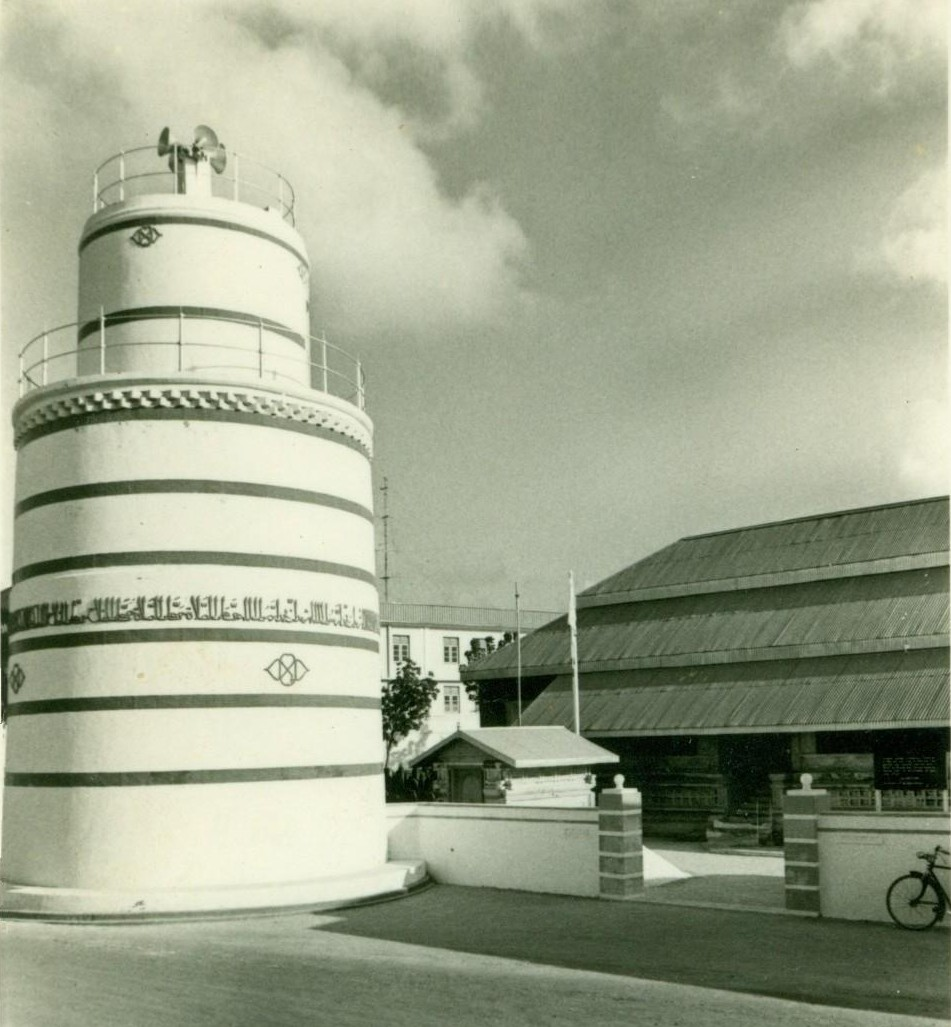
Malé Friday Mosque

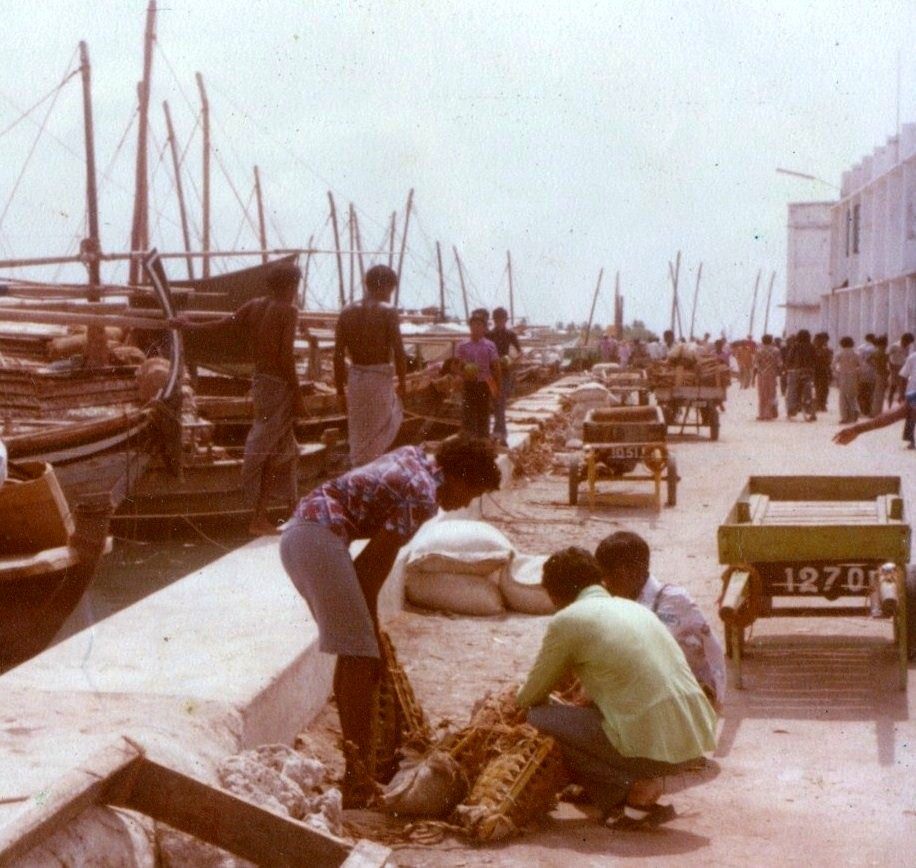
Malé beachfront, 1984

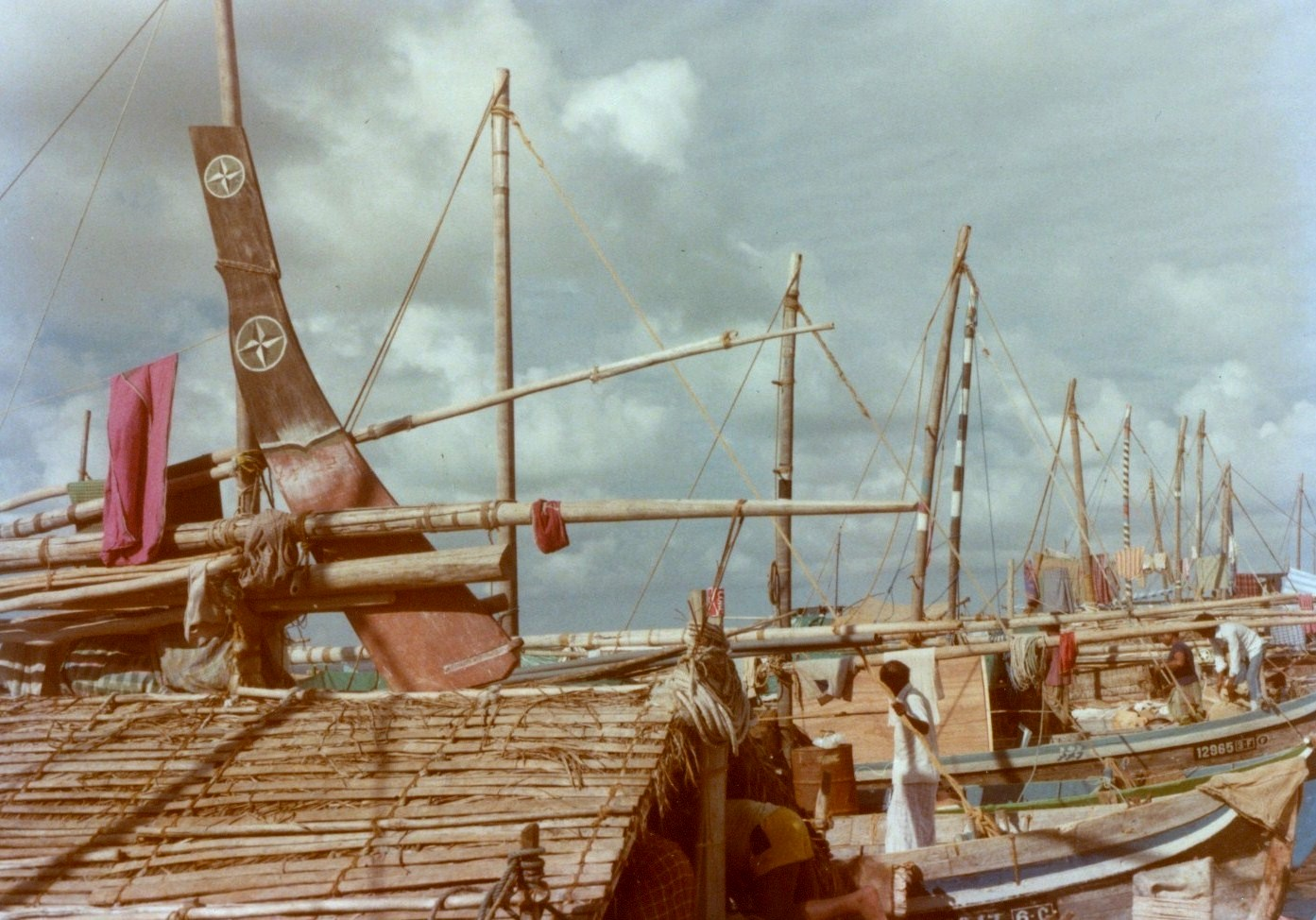
Malé beachfront, 1984

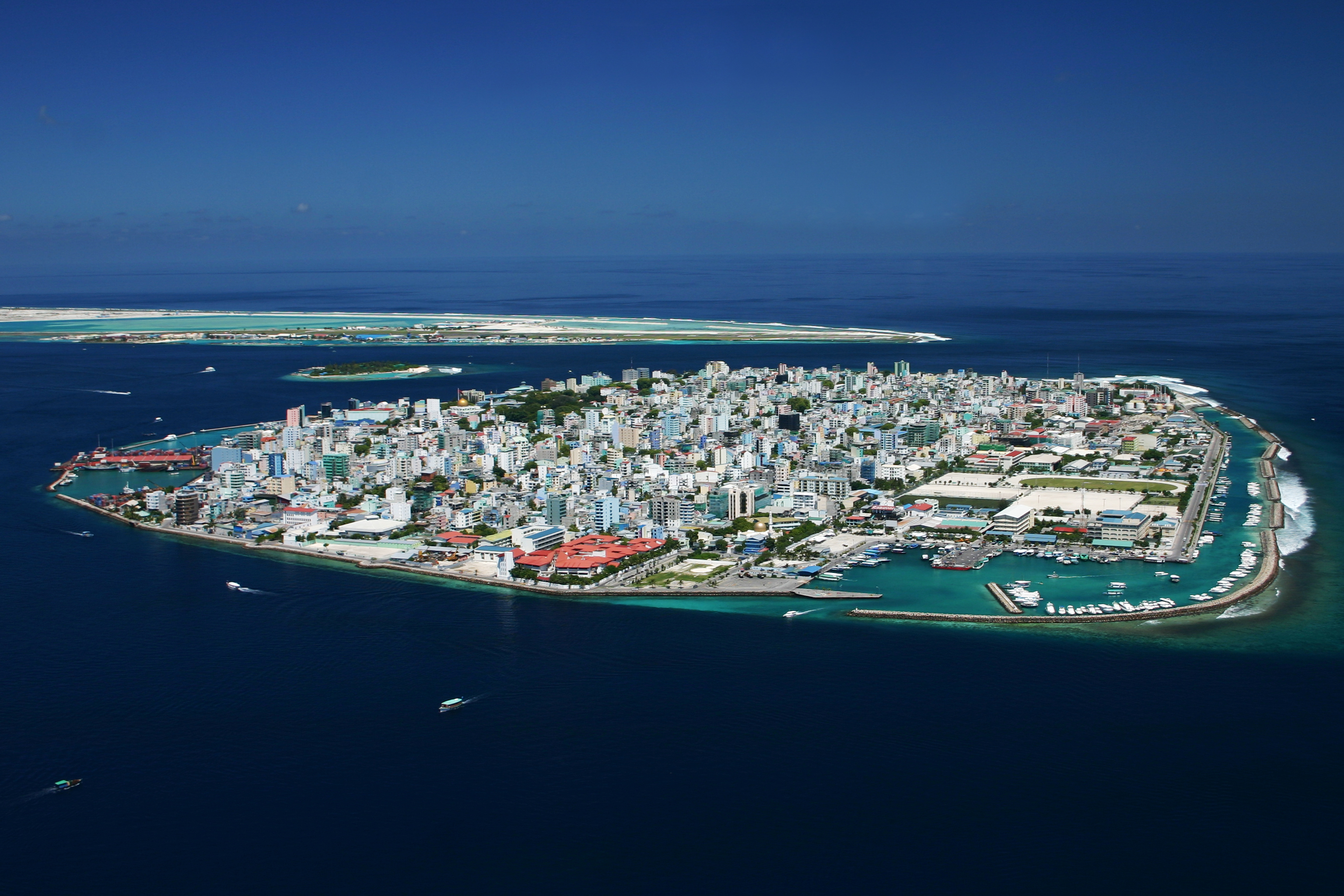
Malé, 2004

== Geography ==
=== Climate ===
Malé has a tropical monsoon climate (Am) under the Köppen climate classification. The city features a mix of both wet and dry seasons, with the wet season lasting from April through January and the drier season covering the months of February and March. Unlike several cities with this climate, Malé experiences relatively consistent temperatures throughout the year, with an average high of 30 °C or 86 °F and an average low of 26.5 °C or 79.7 °F, which is equivalent to many equatorial cities' average year-round daily mean. The city averages slightly more than 1,900 millimetres or 75 inches of precipitation annually. The temperature is constantly high year-round.

Climate data for Malé (Velana International Airport) 1991–2020, extremes 1966–present
| Month | Jan | Feb | Mar | Apr | May | Jun | Jul | Aug | Sep | Oct | Nov | Dec | Year |
|---|---|---|---|---|---|---|---|---|---|---|---|---|---|
| Record high °C (°F) | 32.8 (91.0) | 33.7 (92.7) | 33.8 (92.8) | 35.0 (95.0) | 34.2 (93.6) | 34.9 (94.8) | 34.2 (93.6) | 33.4 (92.1) | 33.4 (92.1) | 33.8 (92.8) | 32.7 (90.9) | 33.5 (92.3) | 35.0 (95.0) |
| Mean daily maximum °C (°F) | 30.6 (87.1) | 31.0 (87.8) | 31.6 (88.9) | 31.9 (89.4) | 31.5 (88.7) | 31.1 (88.0) | 30.8 (87.4) | 30.7 (87.3) | 30.5 (86.9) | 30.5 (86.9) | 30.4 (86.7) | 30.4 (86.7) | 30.9 (87.6) |
| Daily mean °C (°F) | 28.2 (82.8) | 28.6 (83.5) | 29.2 (84.6) | 29.6 (85.3) | 29.3 (84.7) | 29.0 (84.2) | 28.7 (83.7) | 28.6 (83.5) | 28.4 (83.1) | 28.3 (82.9) | 28.1 (82.6) | 28.0 (82.4) | 28.7 (83.7) |
| Mean daily minimum °C (°F) | 26.0 (78.8) | 26.3 (79.3) | 26.8 (80.2) | 27.1 (80.8) | 26.6 (79.9) | 26.4 (79.5) | 25.9 (78.6) | 25.9 (78.6) | 25.7 (78.3) | 25.7 (78.3) | 25.5 (77.9) | 25.6 (78.1) | 26.1 (79.0) |
| Record low °C (°F) | 20.6 (69.1) | 22.6 (72.7) | 22.4 (72.3) | 21.8 (71.2) | 20.6 (69.1) | 22.1 (71.8) | 22.5 (72.5) | 21.0 (69.8) | 20.5 (68.9) | 22.5 (72.5) | 19.2 (66.6) | 22.0 (71.6) | 19.2 (66.6) |
| Average rainfall mm (inches) | 86.8 (3.42) | 37.9 (1.49) | 48.6 (1.91) | 127.2 (5.01) | 238.2 (9.38) | 146.1 (5.75) | 198.1 (7.80) | 193.2 (7.61) | 213.7 (8.41) | 245.4 (9.66) | 235.6 (9.28) | 212.2 (8.35) | 1,983 (78.07) |
| Average rainy days (≥ 1.0 mm) | 5.5 | 3.2 | 4.5 | 8.5 | 15.0 | 12.9 | 13.7 | 13.0 | 15.3 | 15.2 | 14.2 | 12.0 | 133.0 |
| Average relative humidity (%) | 78 | 76 | 76 | 78 | 80 | 80 | 79 | 80 | 80 | 80 | 81 | 80 | 79 |
| Mean monthly sunshine hours | 258.4 | 263.5 | 287.9 | 259.6 | 222.6 | 210.5 | 212.4 | 229.1 | 208.1 | 229.8 | 203.8 | 215.1 | 2,800.8 |
Source 1: World Meteorological Organization (humidity 1981-2010)
Source 2: Meteo Climat (record highs and lows)

=== Subdivisions ===
The city is divided into six divisions, four of which are on Malé Island: Henveiru, Galolhu, Maafannu, and MacchanGoalhi. The nearby island of Villimalé, formerly a tourist resort and before that a prison, is the fifth division. The sixth division is Hulhumalé, an artificial island settled since 2004. In addition, the airport Island Hulhulé is part of the city. Plans have been made to develop the Gulhifalhu reef, implementation began in 2008.

| Nr. | Division | Area (km^{2}) | Population (2014 census) |
|---|---|---|---|
| 1 | Henveiru | 0.591 | 27,254 |
| 2 | Galolhu | 0.276 | 23,062 |
| 3 | Machchangolhi | 0.326 | 22,745 |
| 4 | Maafannu | 0.759 | 36,437 |
| 1-4 | Malé (island) | 1.952 | 109,498 |
| 5 | Villimalé | 0.318 | 7,516 |
| 6 | Hulhumalé | 4.0 | 14,843 |
| 7 | Hulhulé | 3.0 | - |
| 5-7 | Atolls | 7.318 | 22,359 |
| | Malé (city) | 9.27 | 133,412 |

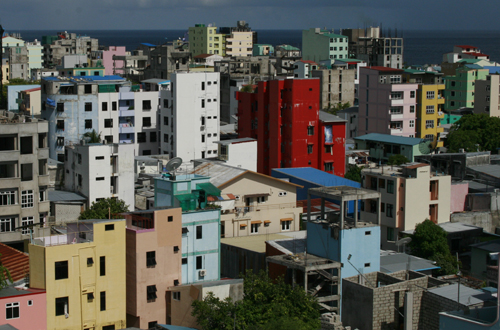
The skyline of Malé

The island of Malé is the eighth most densely populated island in the world, and it is the 160th most populous island in the world. Since there is no surrounding countryside, all infrastructure has to be located in the city itself. Water is provided from desalinated ground water; the water works pumps brackish water from 50–60 m (160–200 ft) deep wells in the city and desalinates that using reverse osmosis. Electric power is generated in the city using diesel generators. Sewage is pumped unprocessed into the sea. Solid waste is transported to nearby islands, where it is used to fill in lagoons. The airport was built in this way, and currently the Thilafushi lagoon is being filled in.

Many government buildings and agencies are located on the waterfront. Velana International Airport is on adjacent Hulhulé Island which includes a seaplane base for internal transportation. Several land reclamation projects have expanded the harbour.

== Economy ==
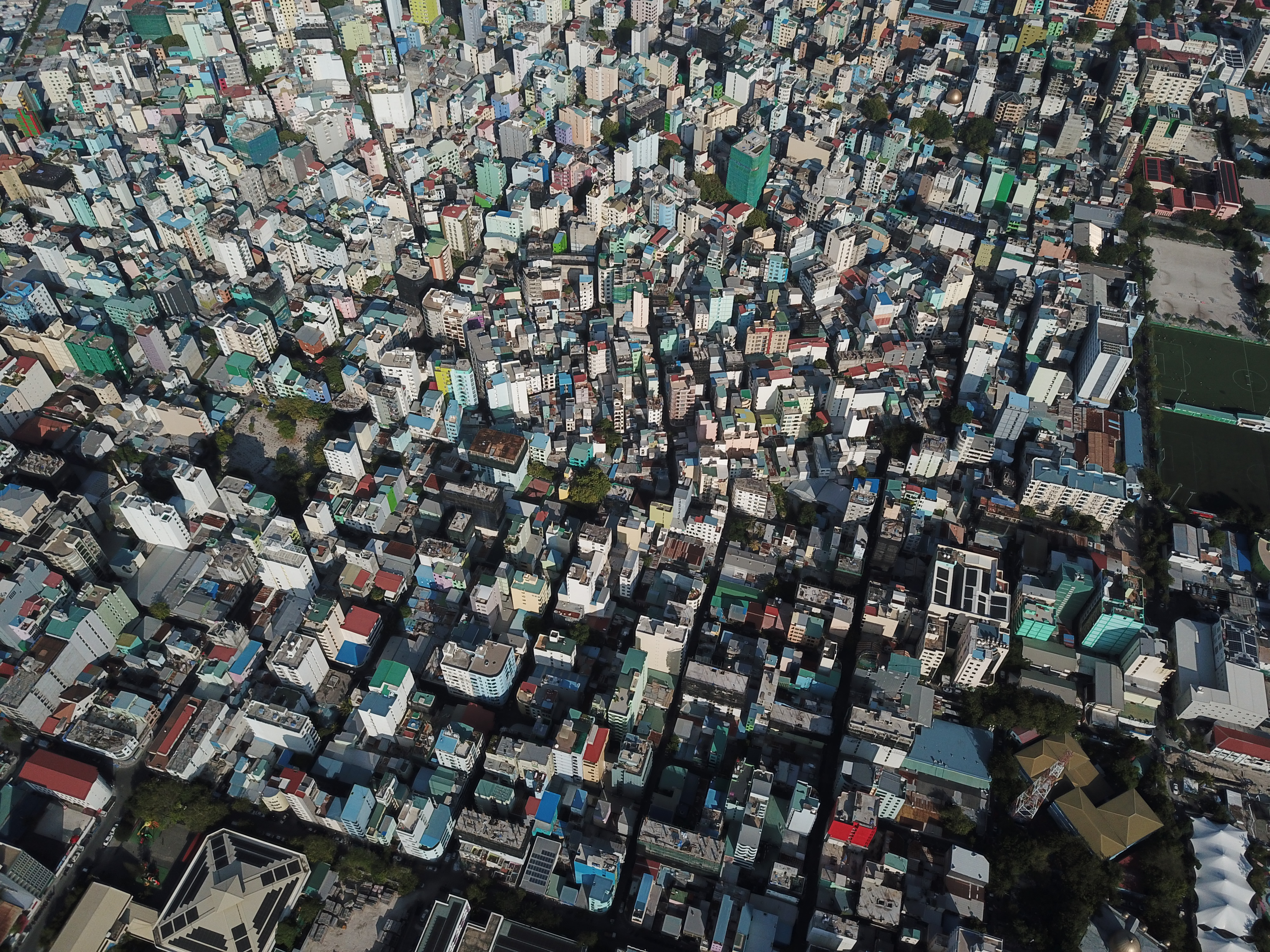
Aerial view of Malé

Tourism is the largest industry in the Maldives, accounting for 28% of GDP and more than 60% of the Maldives' foreign exchange receipts. The GDP per capita expanded by 265% in the 1980s and a further 115% in the 1990s. Over 90% of government tax revenue comes from import duties and tourism-related taxes. Malé, the capital, has many tourist attractions and nearby resorts. Maldivian, the airline of the Maldives, has its head office in Malé, as does the airline Villa Air.

The central harbour and port of the Maldives are located in Malé, the centre for all commercial activities. The Maldives Transport and Contracting Company (MTCC) was formed in 1980 to contribute towards the development of infrastructure and transport services in the Maldives. The port is part of the 21st Century Maritime Silk Road that runs from the Chinese coast via the Suez Canal to the Mediterranean, there to the Upper Adriatic region with its rail connections to Central and Eastern Europe.

== Transport ==
=== Road ===
Each of the islands of Malé is served by a dense network of paved roads, which are named magu (thoroughfare or street), hingun (road or street), and goalhi (small road or alley). Road traffic is heavy, especially on Malé Island.

Malé and Hulhulé Island are linked by the Sinamalé Bridge, which was opened to traffic in October 2018, while Hulhulé and Hulhumalé are linked via a causeway, thus allowing the road networks of the three islands to be connected.

==== Public transport ====
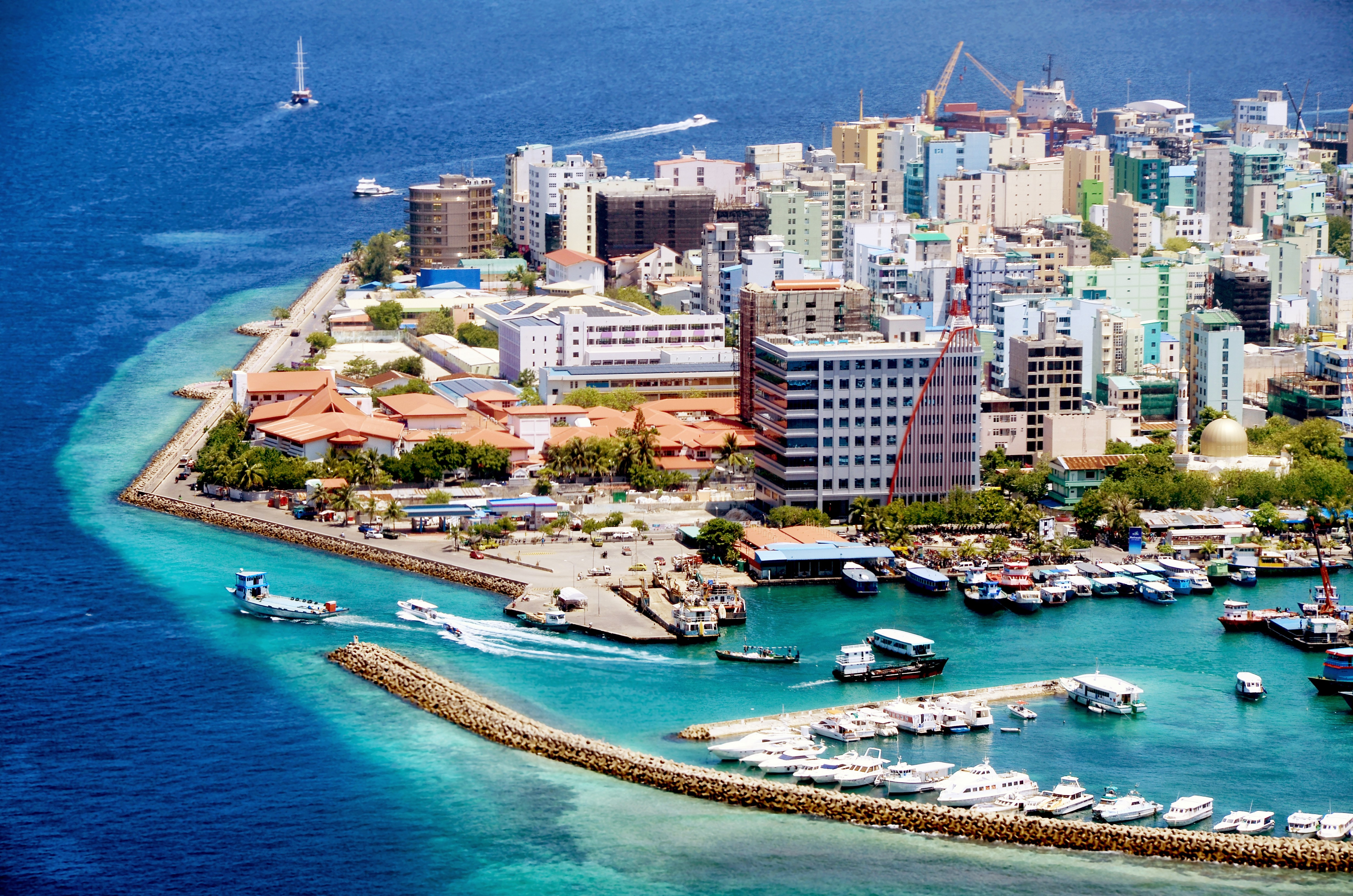
Malé, 2014

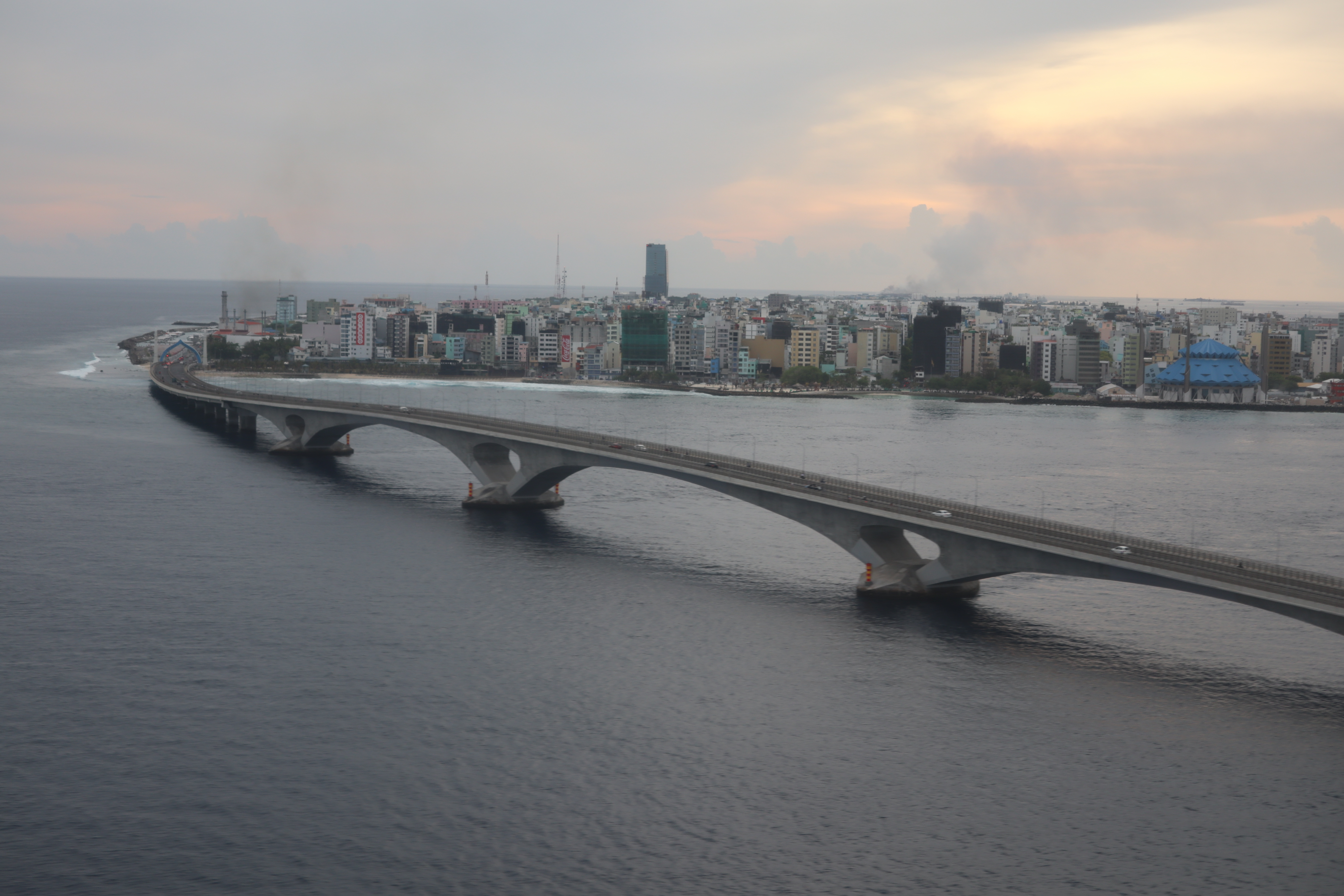
Sinamalé Bridge, open since 2018

Public transport in Malé primarily consists of 3 minibus lines that run through the city, and connect the Greater Malé region to the main island. All the routes are operated by Raajje Transport Link (RTL). These busses go through the wider roads through the city. Children under 18, people with special needs, and people above 65 years of age ride for free.

The Orchid Route (R10), the Ameenee Route (R11) and the Sosun Route (R12). The routes are named after the main roads that the minibus drives through in Malé, being Orchid Magu, Ameenee Magu and Sosun Magu. The Malé system has a total of 41 stops, of which R10 and R11 stop at 20 each, while R12 stops at 8. All 3 routes go through Majeedhee Magu, in the centre of the city.

R11 to R9 are various routes connecting Malé to Hulhumalé and Velana International Airport. These buses are much larger, and in late 2020, began operating double-decker buses to Hulhumalé. The buses move between the islands using the Sinamalé Bridge.

R13 Is an internal minibus route located internally within Villimalé and goes through 13 stops. It uses much smaller electrical-powered buses along with the Sosun Route (R12).

=== Air ===
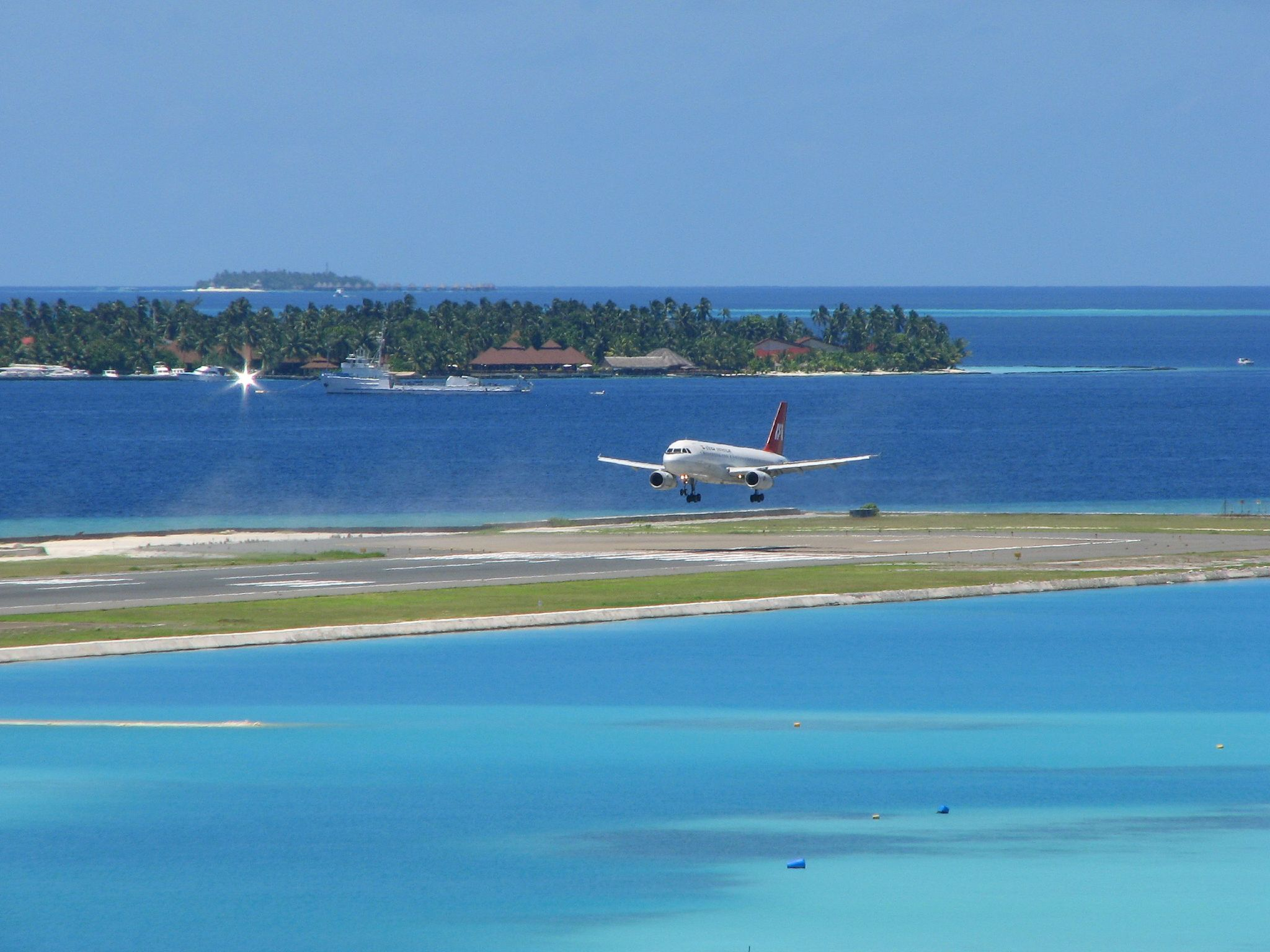
Velana International Airport

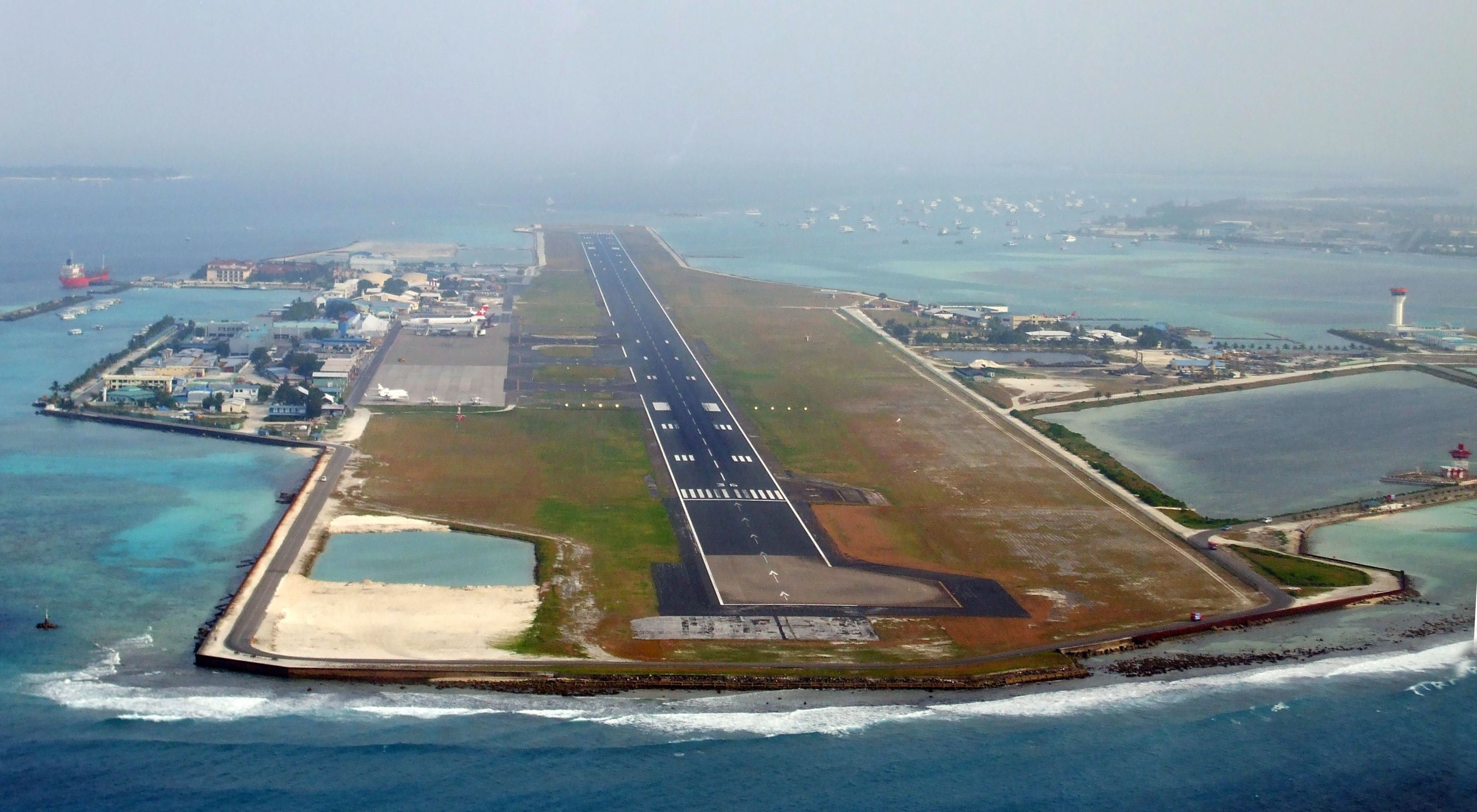
Main runway of Velana International Airport

Velana International Airport is located on nearby Hulhulé island and is the city's airport as well as the principal airport in Maldives. With the opening of the Sinamalé Bridge, the airport is now accessible from Malé by road. Before the opening of the bridge, transport between the airport and Malé was by a frequent ferry service. Hulhulé and Hulhumalé have been connected via a causeway since the development of Hulhumalé, allowing the airport to be accessed by road from the latter.

=== Ferries and speedboats ===
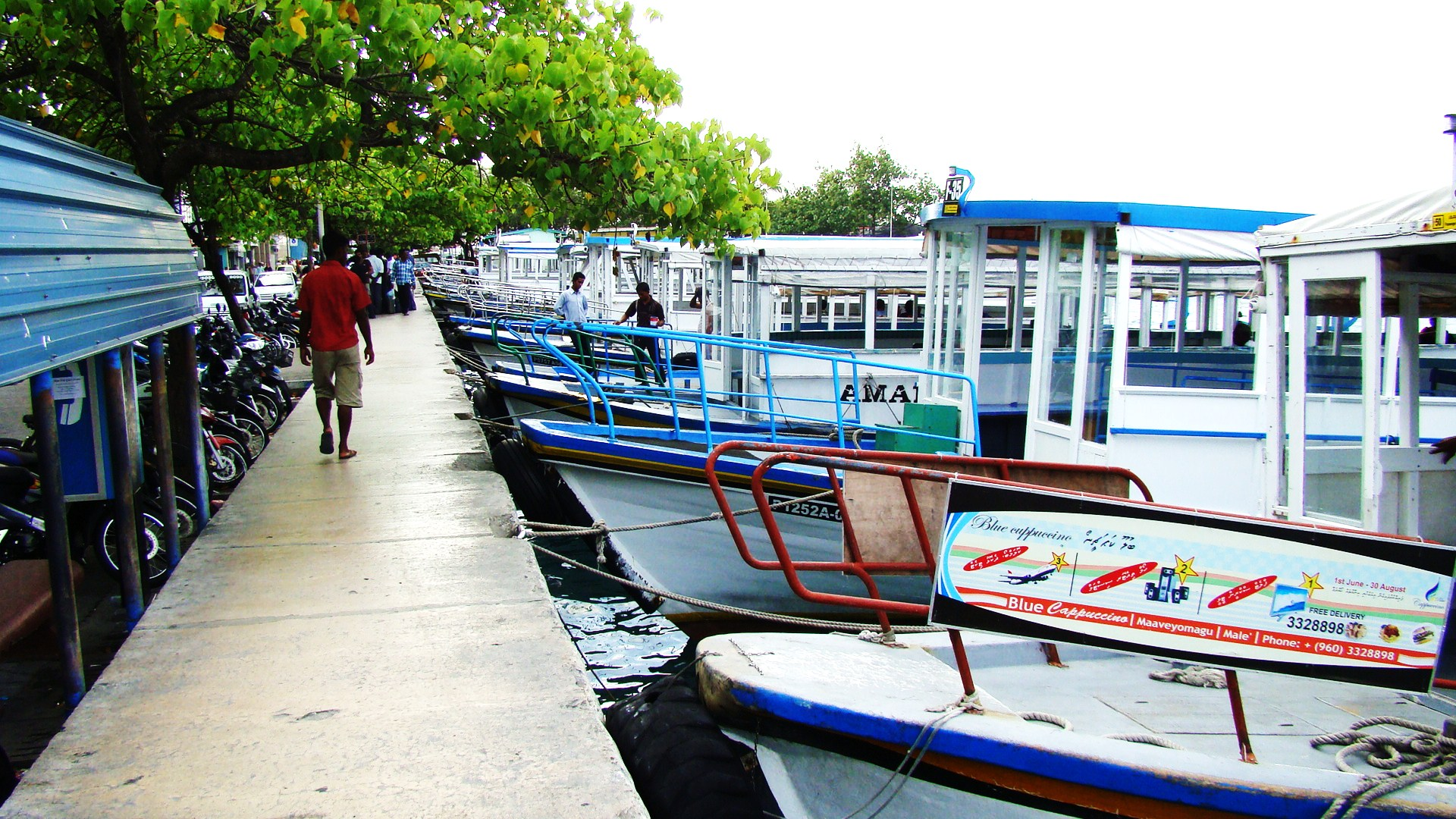
Private ferries in the north harbour of Malé

There is regular scheduled public ferry service from the island of Malé to the islands of Villimalé, Hulhumalé, Thilafushi and Gulhifalhu operated by the Maldives Transport and Contracting Company. Premium high-speed ferries operated by the also travel between islands in the region. The government has made an effort in recent years to improve the frequency and connectivity of public ferry services in Malé, most notably through the Raajje Transport Link initiative.

In addition to public ferries, numerous private chartered ferry and speedboat services operate to and from Malé.

=== Port ===
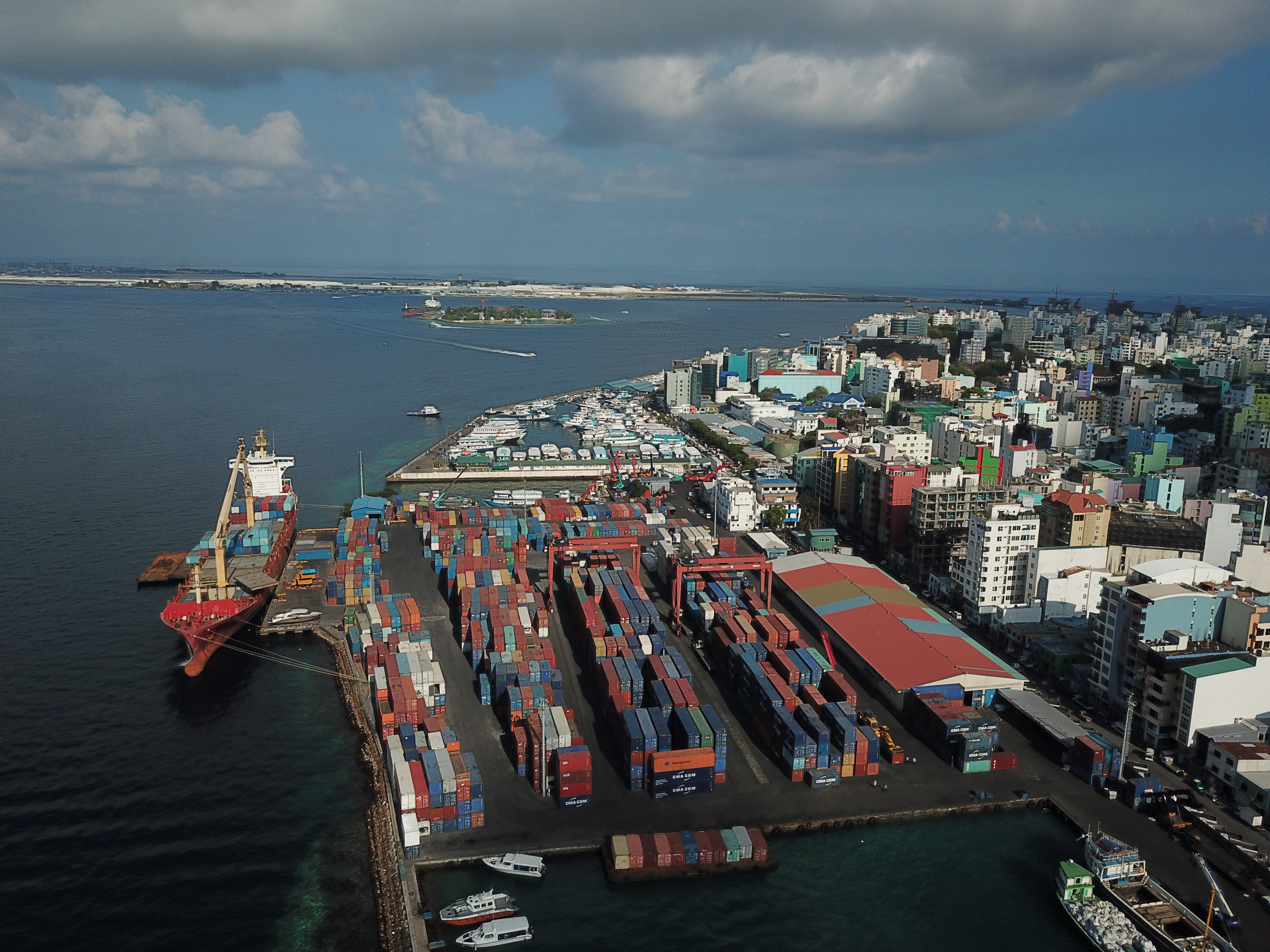
Port of Malé

The Island of Malé is the main commercial port of the Maldives. It is located on reclaimed land in the Maafannu ward in the north-west of the island. Most of the cargo that arrives in the Maldives passes through the Port of Malé. The port is managed by the Maldives Ports Authority.

== Government ==
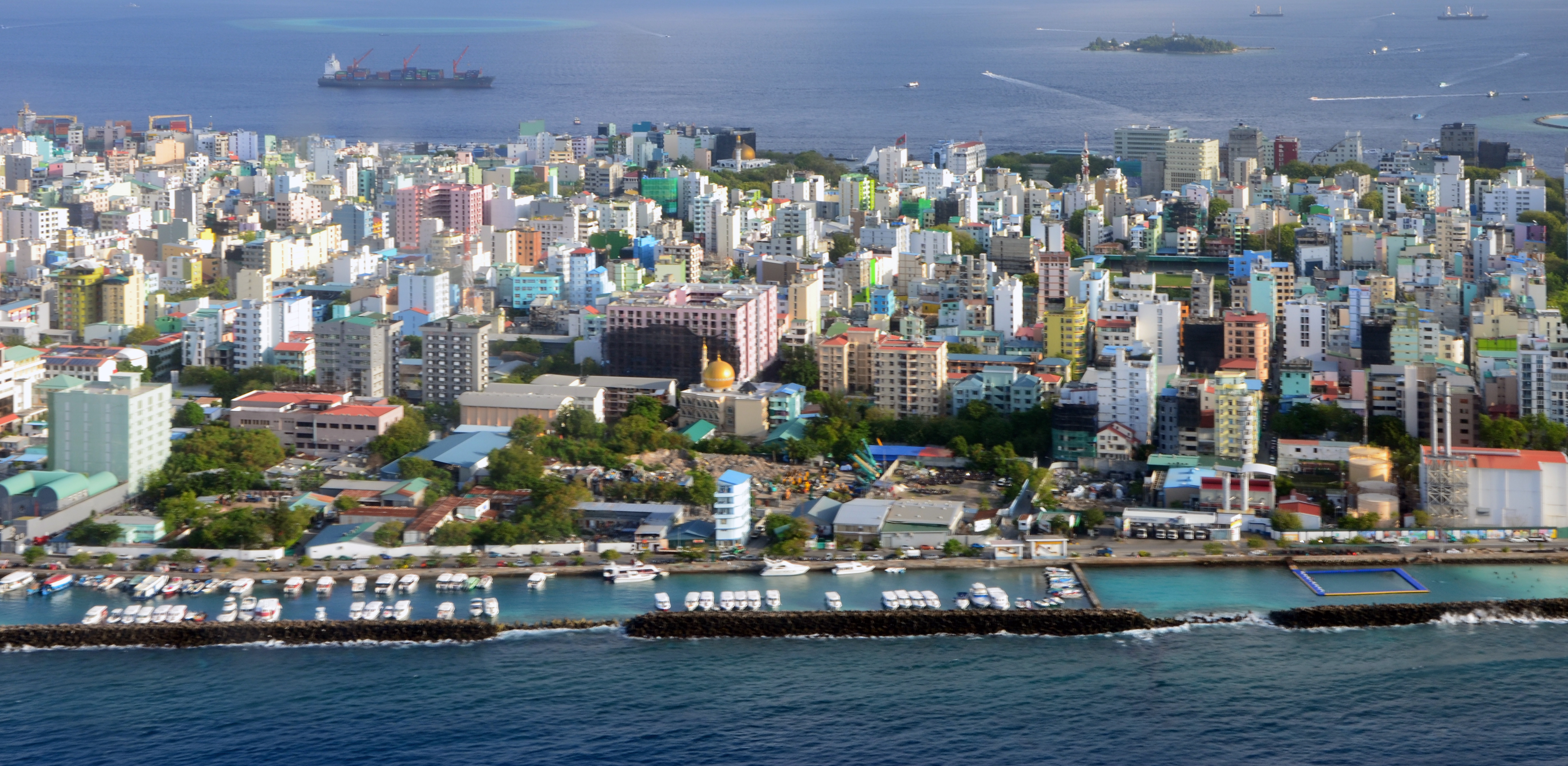
Coast of Malé

=== City Council ===
Malé City Council is the local government authority that governs the islands of Malé, Hulhumalé and Villimalé. The council was created in 2011, as per the Decentralization Act of 2010. There are 17 single member districts; 15 districts in Malé, 1 district in Hulhumalé and 1 district in Villimalé. The mayor and the council are elected under a mayor–council form of local government.

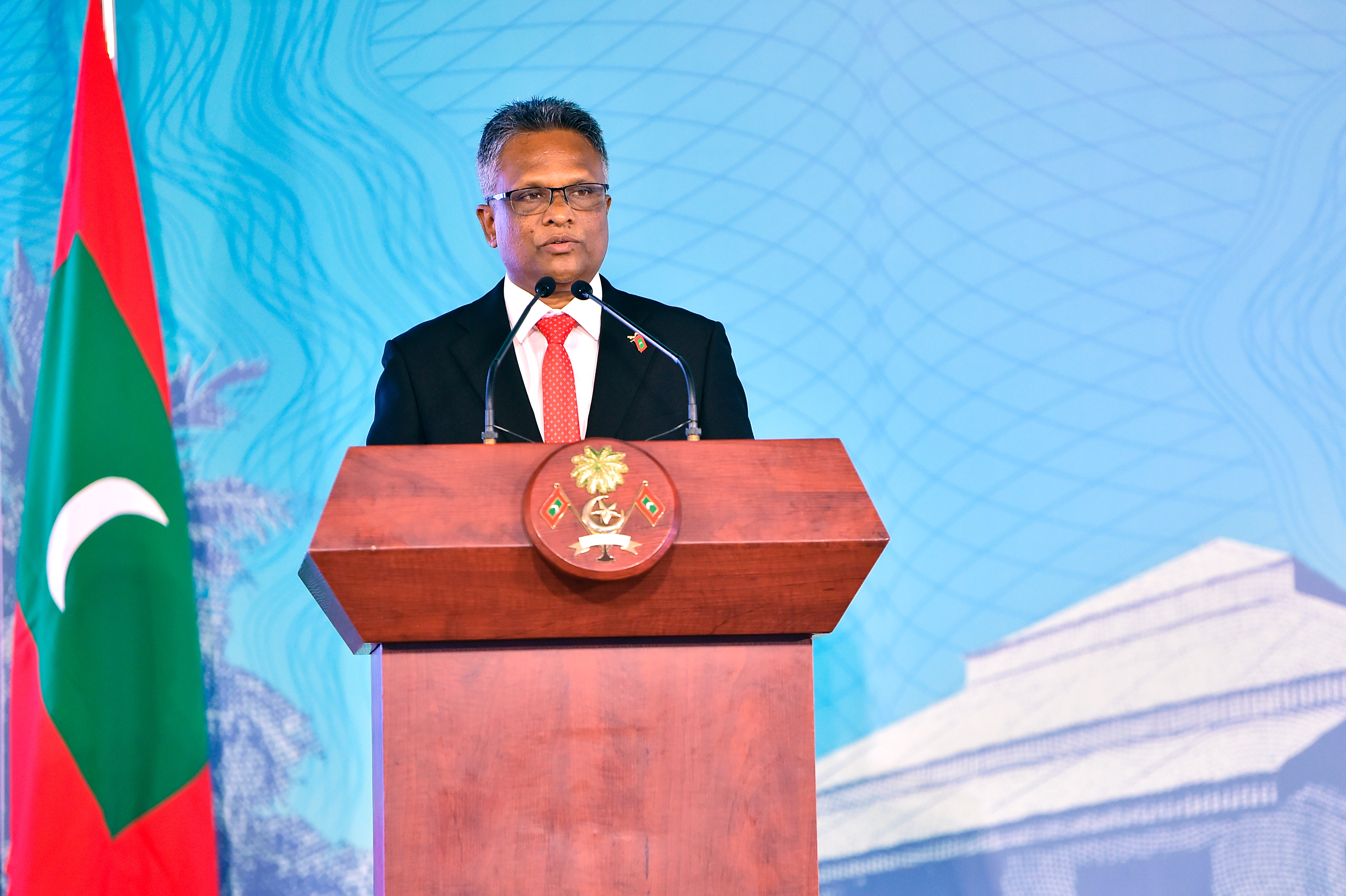
Mayor Azim giving a speech at his oath taking ceremony

In the Local Council Elections in 2021, the mayor was directly elected for the first time, with Mohamed Muizzu being elected to the position. The Progressive Party of the Maldives picked up 11 seats while the Maldivian Democratic Party picked up 6 seats. After Muizzu resigned to run for president, a by-election was triggered. Adam Azim of the MDP won the mayoral by-election, resulting in a split party city government, with an MDP mayor and PPM-PNC led council.

National Government

Malé is the seat of the Maldivian government. Most national government ministries, departments and authorities are based in Malé. There are 16 MPs representing Malé in the People's Majilis; 12 from the People's National Congress, 3 from the Maldivian Democratic Party and 1 from the Maldives National Party as of September 2025.

== Notable people ==
- Ali Niyaf (born 1980), neurosurgeon and medical association president

== See also ==
- Hulhumalé artificial island
- Hulhulé Island, where Velana International Airport is located
- Malé Friday Mosque
- Lonuziyaaraiy Park
