= Giraavaru =

Giraavaru may refer to:

- The Giraavaru people
- Giraavaru (Kaafu Atoll) (Maldives)
- Giraavaru (Raa Atoll) (Maldives)
