= Meerufenfushi =

Meerufenfushi may refer to the following places in the Maldives:

- Meerufenfushi (Alif Alif Atoll)
- Meerufenfushi (Kaafu Atoll)
