= Hani Kandu =

Hani Kandu is the channel between Gaafaru and North Malé Atoll, both within Kaafu Atoll in the Maldives.
