= Maafushi =

Maafushi may refer to the following places in the Republic of Maldives:

- Maafushi (Kaafu Atoll), an inhabited island
- Maafushi (Baa Atoll), an uninhabited island
- Maafushi (Dhaalu Atoll), an uninhabited island
- Maafushi (Faafu Atoll), an uninhabited island
