= Music Concierge =

Music Concierge Limited
- Company type: Private limited company
- Industry: Retail, hospitality, technology, music
- Founded: by Rob Wood, 2007
- Headquarters: Hertfordshire and London; Area served: Worldwide
- Key people: Rob Wood
- Services: Music consultancy, music provision
- Website: www.musicconcierge.co.uk

Music Concierge is a music consultancy firm that specializes in creating customized soundtracks for clients in the hotel, food and beverage, and retail industries.

== Clients ==
When the Connaught Hotel’s Coburg Bar was refitted, Music Concierge was contracted to create a new audio identity.

Music Concierge supply the music to resort Huvafen Fushi in the Maldives. They also provide a music service to fashion company Mulberry.
