= Giraavaru Island =

Giraavaru Island may refer to:

- Giraavaru (Kaafu Atoll) (Maldives)
- Giraavaru (Raa Atoll) (Maldives) on List of islands of the Maldives
