= Gulhi =

Island in Kaafu Atoll, Maldives

Gulhi ގުޅި
- Inhabited island
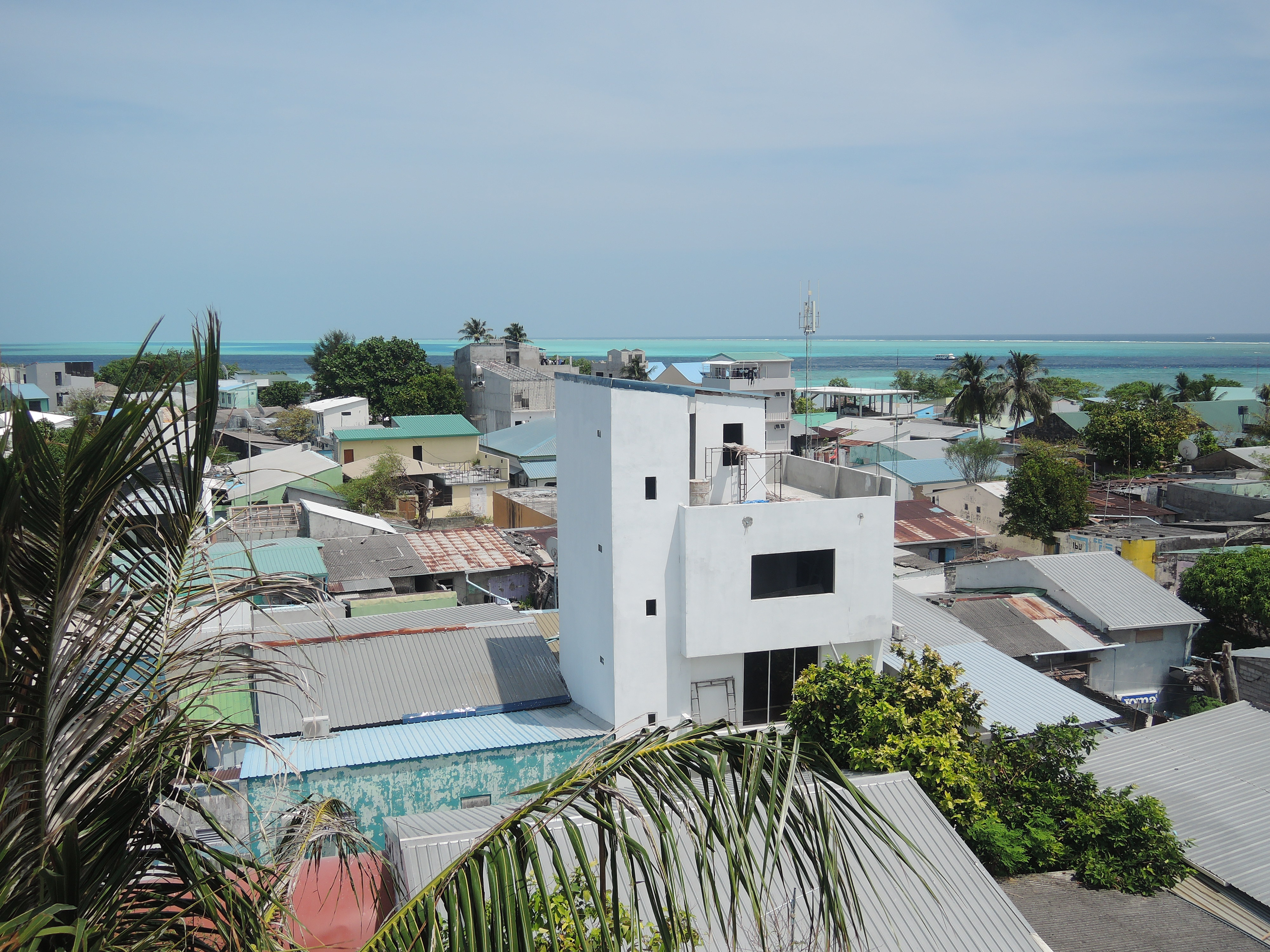

- Location in Maldives
- Coordinates: 03°59′20″N 73°30′32″E
- Country: Maldives
- Administrative atoll: Kaafu Atoll
- Distance to Malé: 20.61 km (12.81 mi)

Dimensions
  - Length: 0.400 km (0.249 mi)
  - Width: 0.225 km (0.140 mi)

Population (2022)
  - Total: 976 (including foreigners)
- Time zone: UTC+05:00 (MST)

Gulhi (Dhivehi: ގުޅި) is one of the inhabited islands of Kaafu Atoll. It is located in the South Malé Atoll close to Maafushi island and connected daily except Friday by MTCC public transport ferry.

== Geography ==
The island is 20.61 km (13 mi; 11 nmi) south of the country's capital, Malé.

== Demography ==
Historical population
Year	Pop.	±%
2006	662	—
2014	832	+25.7%
2022	976	+17.3%
2006-2022: Census populations Source:
