= Giraavaru people =

Indigenous people of Giraavaru Island, Maldives

Giraavarus
Regions with significant populations
- Maldives

Languages
- Dhivehi, Tamil

Religion
- Islam

Related ethnic groups
- Maldivians, Malayalis, Tamils, Dravidians

The Giraavaru people are indigenous people of the Giravaaru islands that are part of the Maldives. They are considered to be the earliest island community of the Maldives, predating Buddhism and the arrival of Indo-Aryan speakers in the archipelago. They are ancient Tamil speakers from the Malabar Coast, who referred to themselves as 'Tamila'. Other mainstream Maldivians considered them to be of lower social status. They lived on the island of Giravaaru until 1972, but were later relocated to Malé, the nation's capital, where they were assimilated in with the local social groups.

== Etymology ==
The name Giraavaru is thought to be derived from the words gira meaning "eroding" and varu meaning "people" or "islanders".

== Origins ==
The Giraavaru origins are descendants of people from the Malabar Coast of India and northwestern shores of Sri Lanka, who probably settled on the island around the Sangam period (300BC–300AD) They are mentioned in the legend about the establishment of the capital and kingly rule in Malé, where the Giraavaru people granted permission to a visiting king Koimala Kalo prior to the foundation of his kingdom on Malé. They heavily mixed with Indo-Aryan speakers to create Modern Dhivehi people.

They were strictly monogamous and prohibited divorce. Their folklore was preserved in song and dance. Their music was audibly different from that of the other islanders. The most distinct items were the necklaces of tiny blue beads which no other Maldivian wore.

It is said that the Giraavaru people were always headed by a woman and that throughout Maldivian history, a woman (foolhuma-dhaitha), represented the Sultan's civil authority in Giravaru Island. The Sultans of the Maldives used to recognize the autonomy of the Giraavaru people and did not apply quite the same laws on them as they did on the rest of their realm. The Giravaru people never seemed to recognize the sovereignty of the Sultans fully. Ordinary Maldivians were required to address the Malé nobility in a different level of speech. However, the Giravaru people did not observe this custom and addressed the Malé nobility as they would usually address themselves. It was believed that the Giravaru people were mortally scared of toads. Things changed in 1932 when a written constitution was adopted. The customary rights of the indigenous Giraavaru people were not recognized in that document. Any rights they seemed to have enjoyed under the absolute rule of the Sultans were extinguished by default.

== End of the culture ==
In 1968, due to heavy erosion of the island and as a result, reduction of the community to a few members, they were forced to abandon their island under an Islamic regulation that did not recognize communities with fewer than 40 adult males, which was the minimum required for the regular performance of Friday prayers. The Giraavaru people were ferried across the atoll lagoon to Hulhulé Island and resettled there. When the airport there was extended they were shifted across to Malé and housed in a few blocks in newly reclaimed areas in the Maafanu district.

The distinct Giraavaru culture swiftly disappeared when the Giraavaru young people were assimilated into the wider Malé society through intermarriage. "Pure" Giraavaru are now thought to be extinct.

== See also ==
- Tivaru
- Maldivians
- Lakshadweep
- Dravidian peoples
- Chola dynasty
- Thiyyar history
