= Hulhumalé =

Hulhumalé ހުޅުމާލެ
- District of Malé City
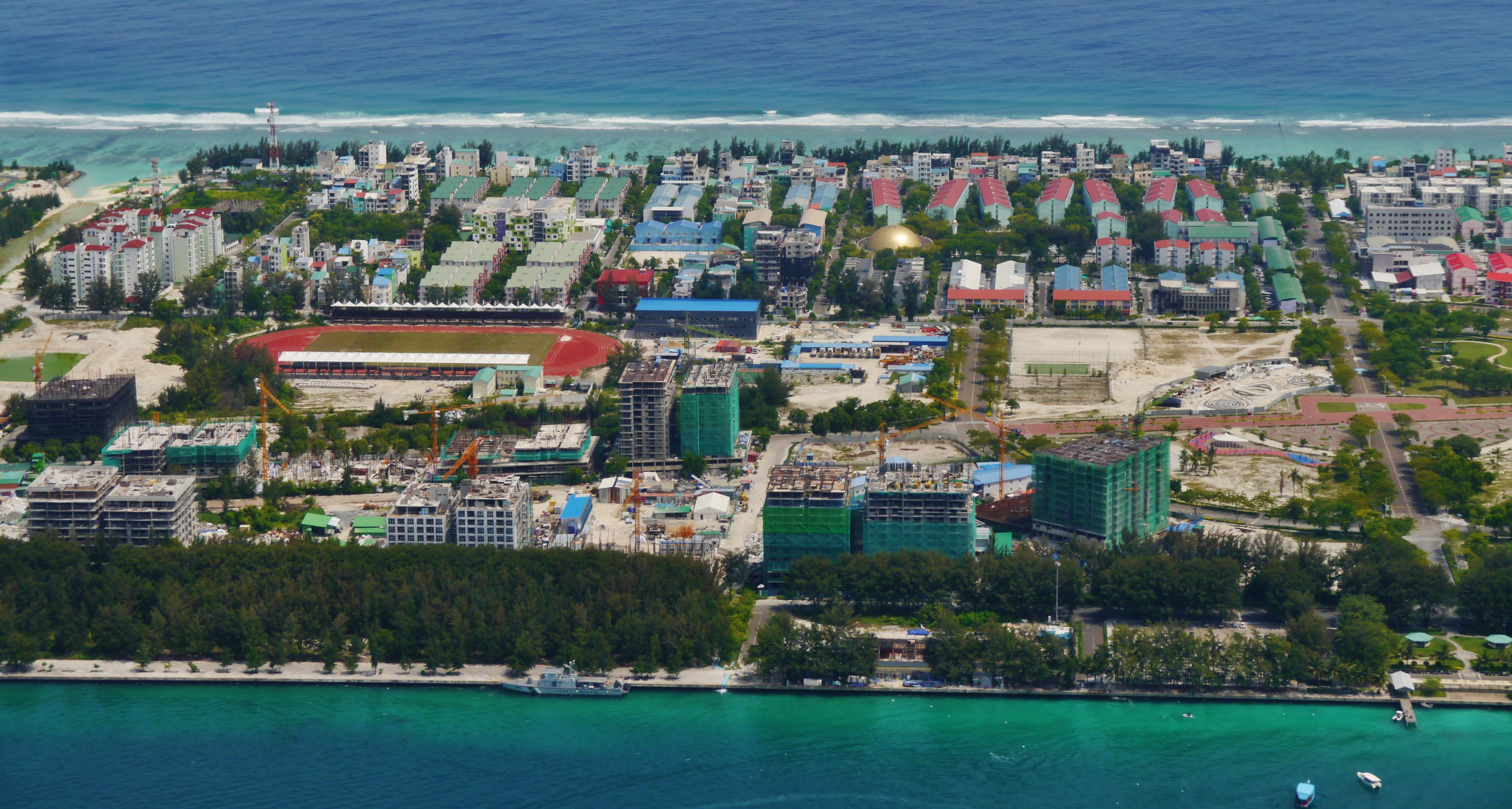
- Aerial view of Hulhumalé in 2018

- Location in Maldives
- Coordinates: 4°12′45″N 73°32′24″E
- Country: Maldives
- Geographic atoll: North Malé Atoll

Government
  - Company: Housing Development Corporation

Area
  - Total: 4 km^{2} (1.5 sq mi)

Dimensions
  - Length: 2.4 km (1.5 mi)
  - Width: 1.0 km (0.62 mi)

Population (2022)
  - Total: 65,714
  - Density: 16,000/km^{2} (43,000/sq mi)
- Time zone: UTC+05:00 (MST)

Hulhumalé (Dhivehi pronunciation: [huɭumɑːlɛ]; Dhivehi: ހުޅުމާލެ) is a reclaimed island located in the south of North Malé Atoll, Maldives. The artificial island is being built up by pumping sand from the sea floor, in order to meet the existing and future housing, industrial and commercial development demands of the Malé region and as a response to the threat posed by rising sea levels. The official settlement was inaugurated by President Maumoon Abdul Gayoom on May 12, 2004.

The development and management of the island is undertaken by a government-owned corporation called Housing Development Corporation (formerly Hulhumalé Development Unit and Urbanco), incorporated on March 23, 2005.

Land reclamation has increased the island's area to 4 km^{2} (1.5 sq mi), making it the fourth largest island in the Maldives. As of December 2019 the island has a population of more than 50,000; it is planned to house as many as 240,000 by the mid-2020s.

== Location within Malé City ==
Hulhumalé is located northeast of the airport island of Hulhulé, to which it is connected by a causeway:

Hulhumalé is also represented at the local level by one councilor in the Malé city council.

== History ==
Reclamation of Hulhumalé began on October 16, 1997, on the Hulhulé-Farukolhufushi lagoon 1.3 km (0.81 mi) off the northwest coast of Malé. Initial reclamation (or Phase I), consisting of 45% of land mass, 188 hectares (460 acres), was carried out by the Ministry of Construction and Public Works (MCPW) at a cost of USD 11 million. The project was then continued by a Belgian Joint Venture Company, International Port Engineering and Management (IPEM) and Dredging International (DI) costing an estimated US$21 million. All the works involving reclamation and coastal structure development covered in Phase I were completed by June 2002, and 1,000 residents moved to the island in 2004. In the next phase of reclamation, completed in 2015, 244 hectares (600 acres) were added; and, by the end of 2019, there were more than 50,000 residents.

== Development ==
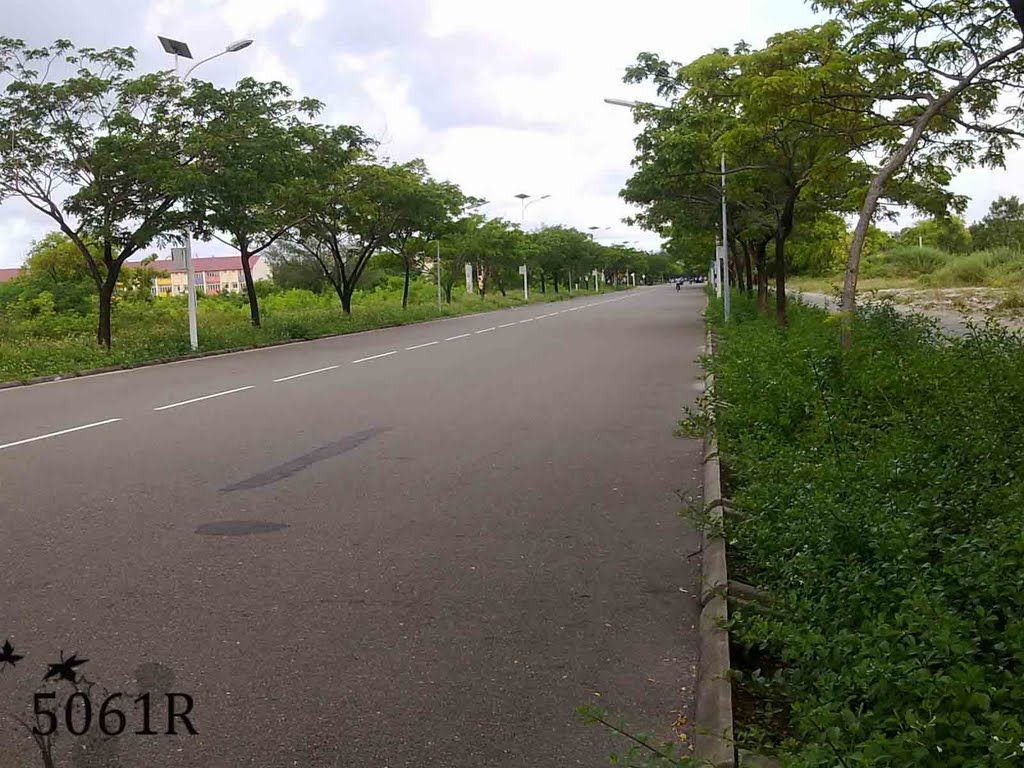
Hulhumalé Road

A basis of development known as Phase I was formed under the first Master Plan which was completed in July 2001 by a consortium of consultants from Singapore with the contribution of many government agencies, committees and individuals. It conceptually defines the long-term land use and development strategy (including urban design proposals, transportation plans and utility infrastructure) with considerations for future infrastructure connections to the adjacent Phase II and planned airport extension areas. The Master Plan is to be periodically reviewed and adjusted to include advances in development.

Phase I of the Master Plan includes:

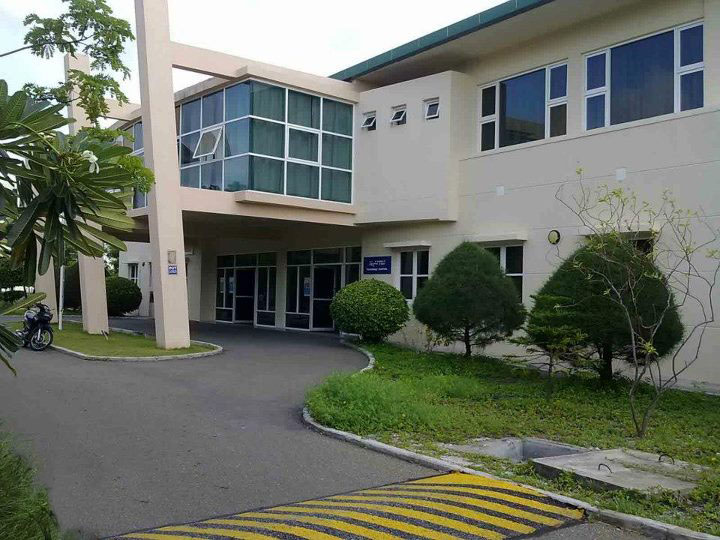
Hulhumalé Hospital

Stage 1A (completed)

- A 280-room apartment complex with a combination of 2,3 and 4 bedroom units
- An integrated primary and secondary school housing 20 classrooms
- A public building for government and social requirements containing 32 units
- A hospital with 50 bed capacity
- A mosque for 1500 people
- Four commercial buildings with a total of 48 units
- An asphalt-paved road network approximately 12.5 km (7.8 mi) long
- An adequate land space for the cultivation of indigenous plants and imported varieties

Stage 1B (Completed)

- 232 condominium housing units
- 120 basic housing units
- 169 beach plots
- 56 standard plots
- 132 terraced houses
- 280 housing units
- 57 residential beach front plots
- 109 residential beach plots
- 56 residential standard plots
- 132 plots for terraced housing
- A public building with 32 public units
- 15 industrial and commercial land plots with an average of 1,000 m^{2} (11,000 sq ft) per unit

Stage 1C (Completed)

- 1900 housing units

Stage 2 (Completed)

- 2950 housing units

Stage 3 (Completed)

- 3075 housing units

Hulhumalé is underutilized relative to other central atolls in the Maldives. It would take the lead of the government to improve utilization by moving government ministries, government departments and public institutions to Hulhumalé and assisting public servants with relocation costs. Pending urban development, greenery landscaping would help make the place more attractive and convenient.

On January 15, 2015, the second reclamation phase of Hulhumalé was launched, which will include the construction of a youth centre. The $50 million project was awarded to Dredging International NV, Belgium earlier this year.

== Transport ==
Hulhumalé's road network was planned together with the development of the island. Transport between Phase 1 and Phase 2 are through 4 bridges. Public transport became more convenient with the introduction of relatively inexpensive buses, that travel internally in Hulhumalé, and also to Velana International Airport and Malé.

The island is connected via a causeway to the airport island Hulhulé Island, allowing easy road transport between the Velana International Airport and Hulhumalé. With the opening of the Sinamalé Bridge between Hulhulé and Malé Island in September 2018, the road networks of the three islands were connected for the first time.

In April 2026,MTCC Launches the first ever Full electric Taxi line Operated by The government.This Taxi line Now has 150 Taxis.

== Gallery ==
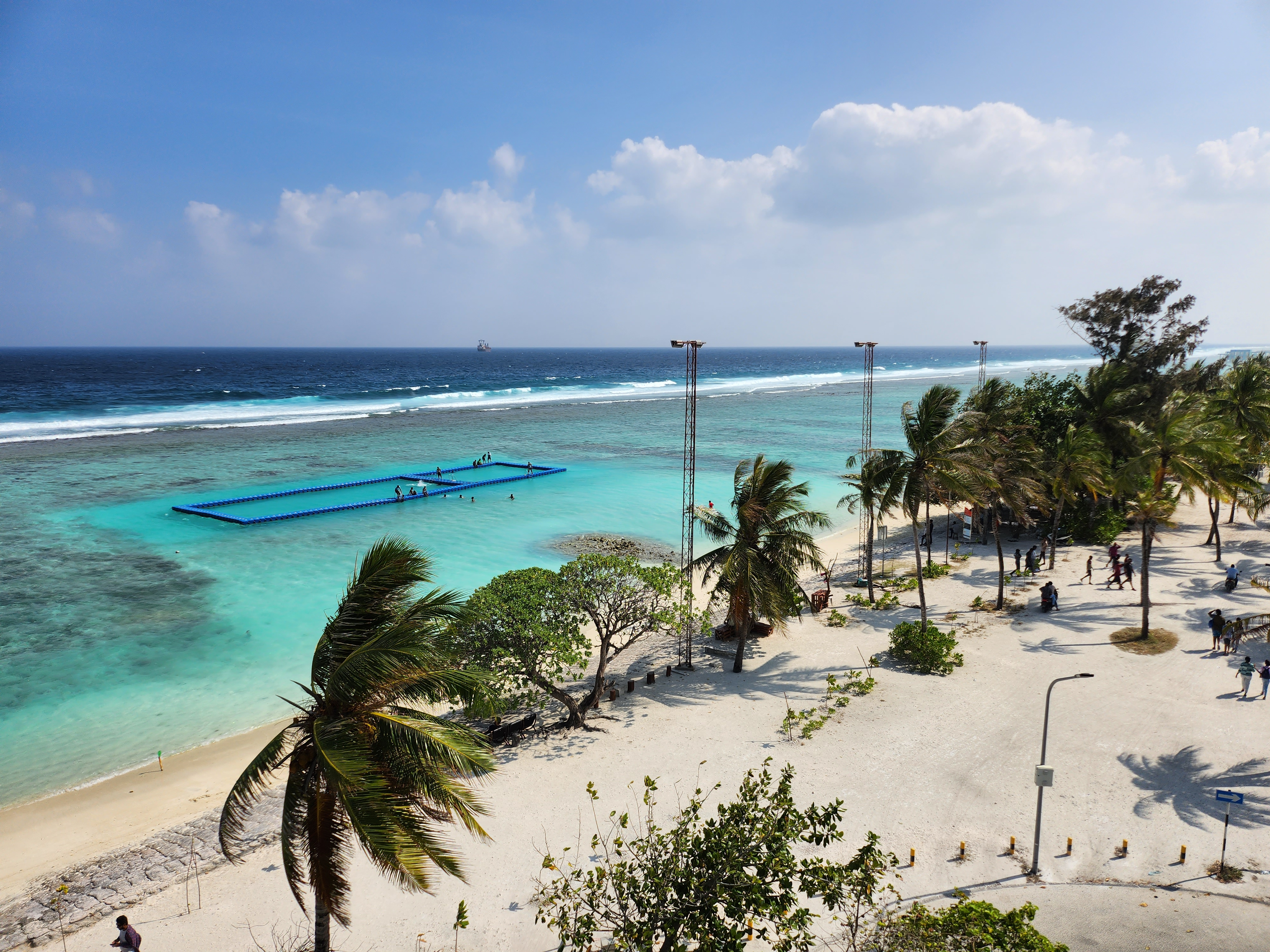
Hulhumale Beach

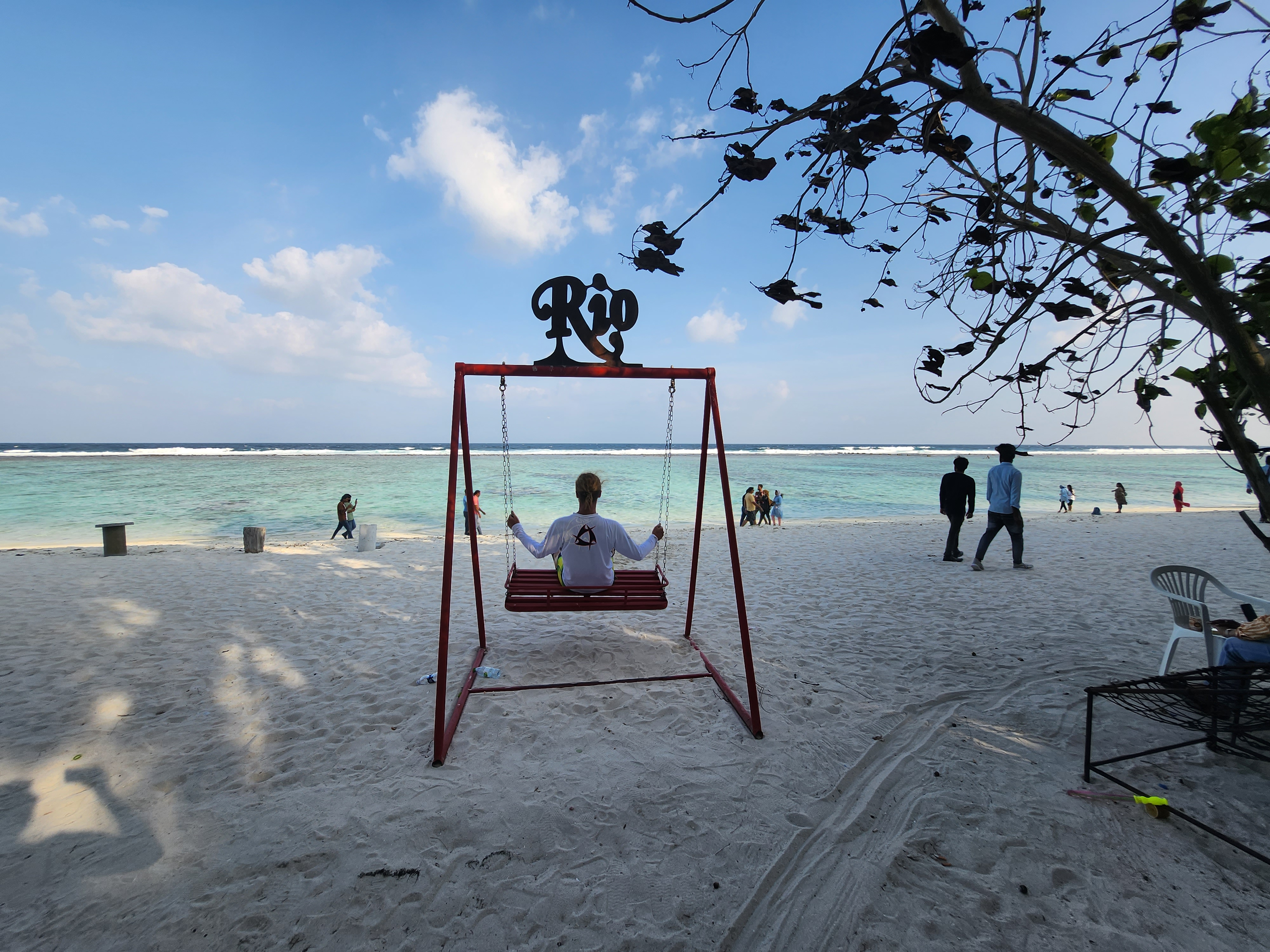
Swing

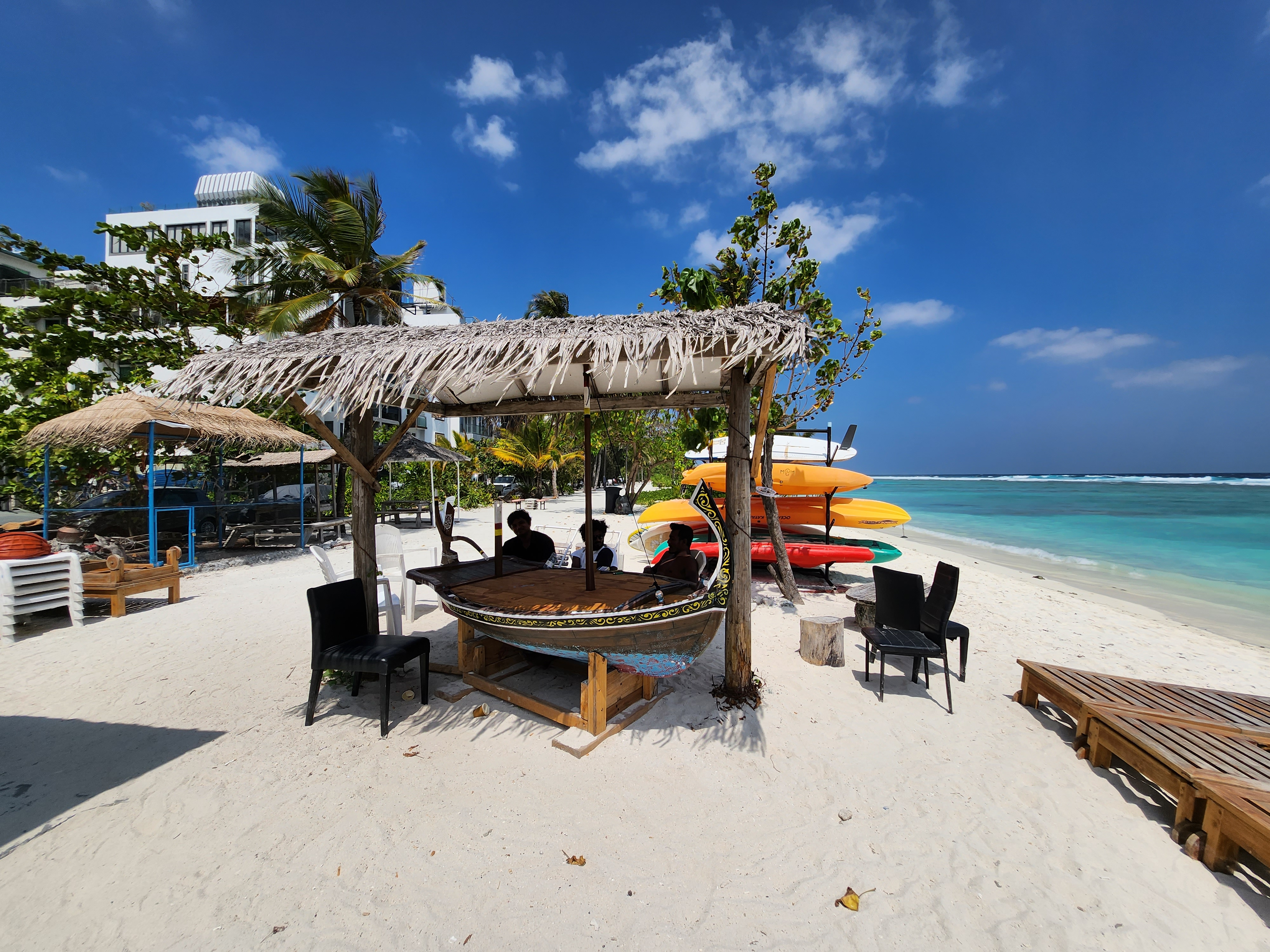
Watersports
