= Huraa (Kaafu Atoll) =

Island in Kaafu Atoll, Maldives

Huraa ހުރާ
- Inhabited island
- Location in Maldives
- Coordinates: 04°20′04″N 73°36′08″E
- Country: Maldives
- Administrative atoll: Kaafu Atoll
- Distance to Malé: 20.42 km (12.69 mi)

Dimensions
  - Length: 0.850 km (0.528 mi)
  - Width: 0.300 km (0.186 mi)

Population (2022)
  - Total: 1,654 (including foreigners)
- Time zone: UTC+05:00 (MST)

Huraa (Dhivehi: ހުރާ) is one of the inhabited islands of Kaafu Atoll.

== History ==
Huraa is well known in the Maldivian history as the last royal dynasty to rule over the Maldives. They have their roots in Huraa island. It was founded in 1757 by Sultan al-Ghazi Hasan 'Izz ud-din. This dynasty is very important to the Maldivian history because Kings, Prime Ministers and many people from important governmental posts haven been from the Huraa. This Dynasty started from Dhonmarudhuru Fadiththakurufaanu (Fadikkaleyfaanu) of Male' Atoll Hura. Historical evidences reveal that he was the son of a French man called 'Louise' and a Maldivian woman from Hura. Hura Dhomarudhuru is the grandfather of the first King of the Hura Dynasty, who was Ah'Sultanul Ghaazee Hassan Izzudhdhin (first) Siri Kularanmeeba Kaththiri Bavana Mahaaradhun (Dhonbandaarain). He was a national hero who saved the people from the rule of the Malabars.

Huraa is also well known for having notable football and volleyball players in national level. The island has Hurriyya Sports Club which was highly active back in late 90's and early 2000's.

== Geography ==
Huraa is located in the North Malé Atoll, and is an inhabited island. The island is situated 20.42 km (13 mi; 11 nmi) towards the northeast of the country's capital, Malé.

=== Ecology ===
There is a mangrove swamp located to the north of the island, and is declared as a protected nature reserve. Its environment with its unique vegetation provide a safe resting place for species of protected birds inhabiting the place. In a study conducted by the IUCN, in Huraa ten different varieties of trees were identified, some true mangrove and others mangrove associated plants.

== Demography ==
Historical population
Year	Pop.	±%
2006	849	—
2014	1,014	+19.4%
2022	1,654	+63.1%
2006-2022: Census populations Source:

== Economy ==
The people of the island are engaged mainly in fishing and tourism activities. Tourism is becoming the major economic activity since the advent of the local guest houses in the island.
