= Gaafaru =

Island in Kaafu Atoll, Maldives

Gaafaru ގާފަރު
- Inhabited island
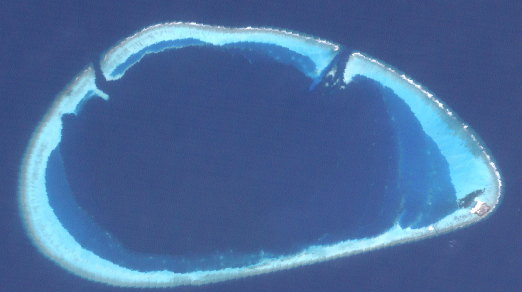
- Gaafaru Atoll, Gaafaru Island in the lower right

- Location in Maldives
- Coordinates: 04°44′10″N 73°29′55″E
- Country: Maldives
- Administrative atoll: Kaafu Atoll
- Distance to Malé: 62.03 km (38.54 mi)

Dimensions
  - Length: 0.525 km (0.326 mi)
  - Width: 0.450 km (0.280 mi)

Population (2022)
  - Total: 1,294 (including foreigners)
- Time zone: UTC+05:00 (MST)

Gaafaru (Dhivehi: ގާފަރު) is one of the inhabited islands of Kaafu Atoll, the only island of the natural atoll known as Gaafaru.

== Geography ==
The island is 62.03 km (39 mi; 33 nmi) north of the country's capital, Malé.

=== Gahaafaru Atoll ===
Gahaafaru or Gaafaru (Northern Reef) is a large elliptical reef with only a small inhabited island at its eastern end. This reef has proved disastrous to many vessels. Gaafaru reef is as much a separate atoll as Goifulhafehendhu Atoll or Rasdhukuramathi Atoll which are similar in structure and size. It is separated from Kagi (the northernmost island of North Malé Atoll) by a narrow but deep channel - the Hani Kandu. Rising sea levels as a result of climate change put the island at "severe risk of flooding in the next century, with half of its land in danger."

== Demography ==
Historical population
Year	Pop.	±%
2006	800	—
2014	1,013	+26.6%
2022	1,294	+27.7%
2006-2022: Census populations Source:
