= Hulhulé =

- District of Malé City
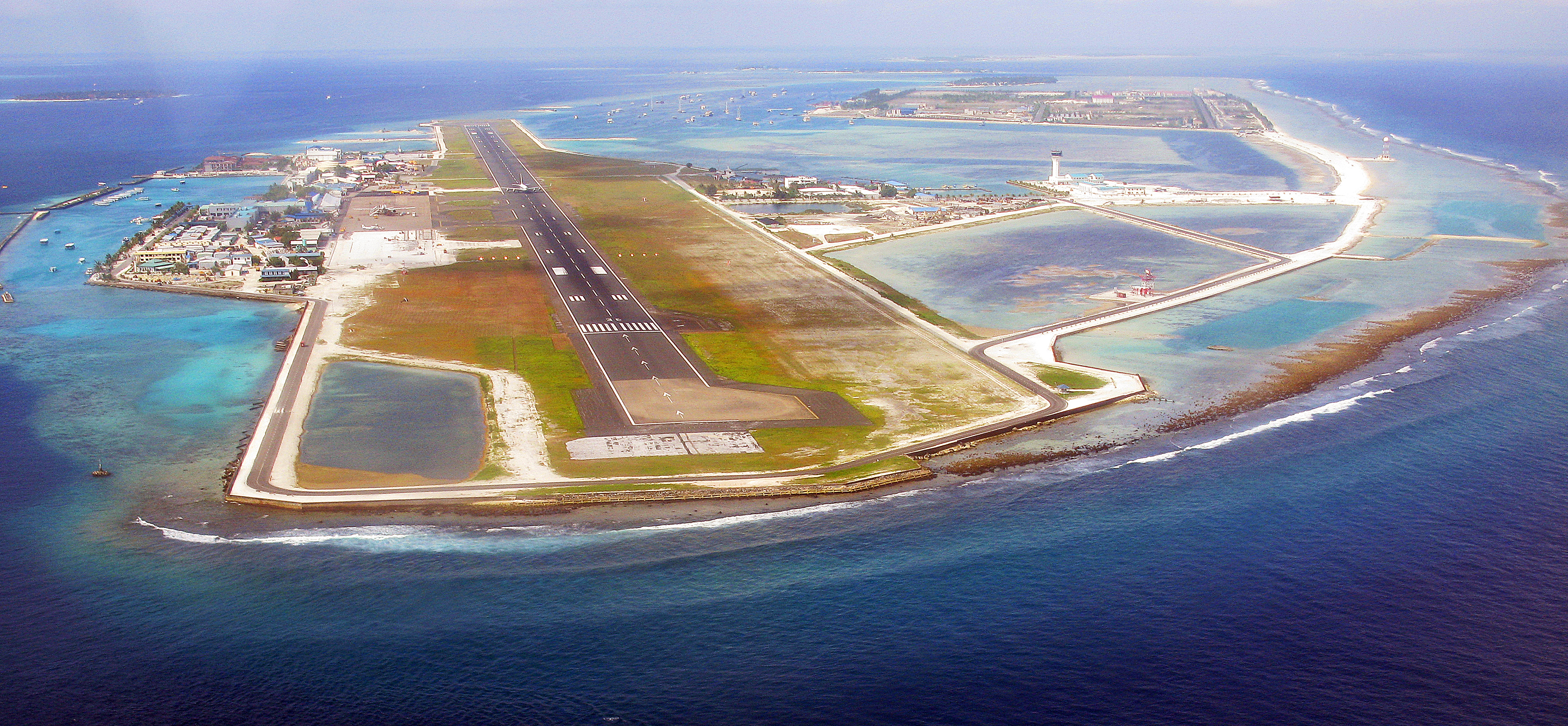
- Hulhulé Island in 2007

- Location in Maldives
- Coordinates: 4.1875°N 73.5292°E
- Country: Maldives
- Geographic atoll: North Malé Atoll

Government
  - Council: Malé City Council

Population
  - Total: 0
- Time zone: UTC+05:00 (MST)

Hulhulé (Dhivehi: ހުޅުލެ), located at 4°11′N 73°32′E, is an island in the North Malé Atoll of the Maldives where the city's airport, Velana International Airport, is located. The island has no permanent population.

It is one of the islands closest to the capital island Malé. Hulhulé is considered a ward of Malé.

The 2.1-kilometre (1.3 mi) Sinamalé Bridge links the island with Malé. The bridge, which has two car lanes and separate lanes for motorcycles and pedestrians, opened on 30 August 2018.

== Velana International Airport ==
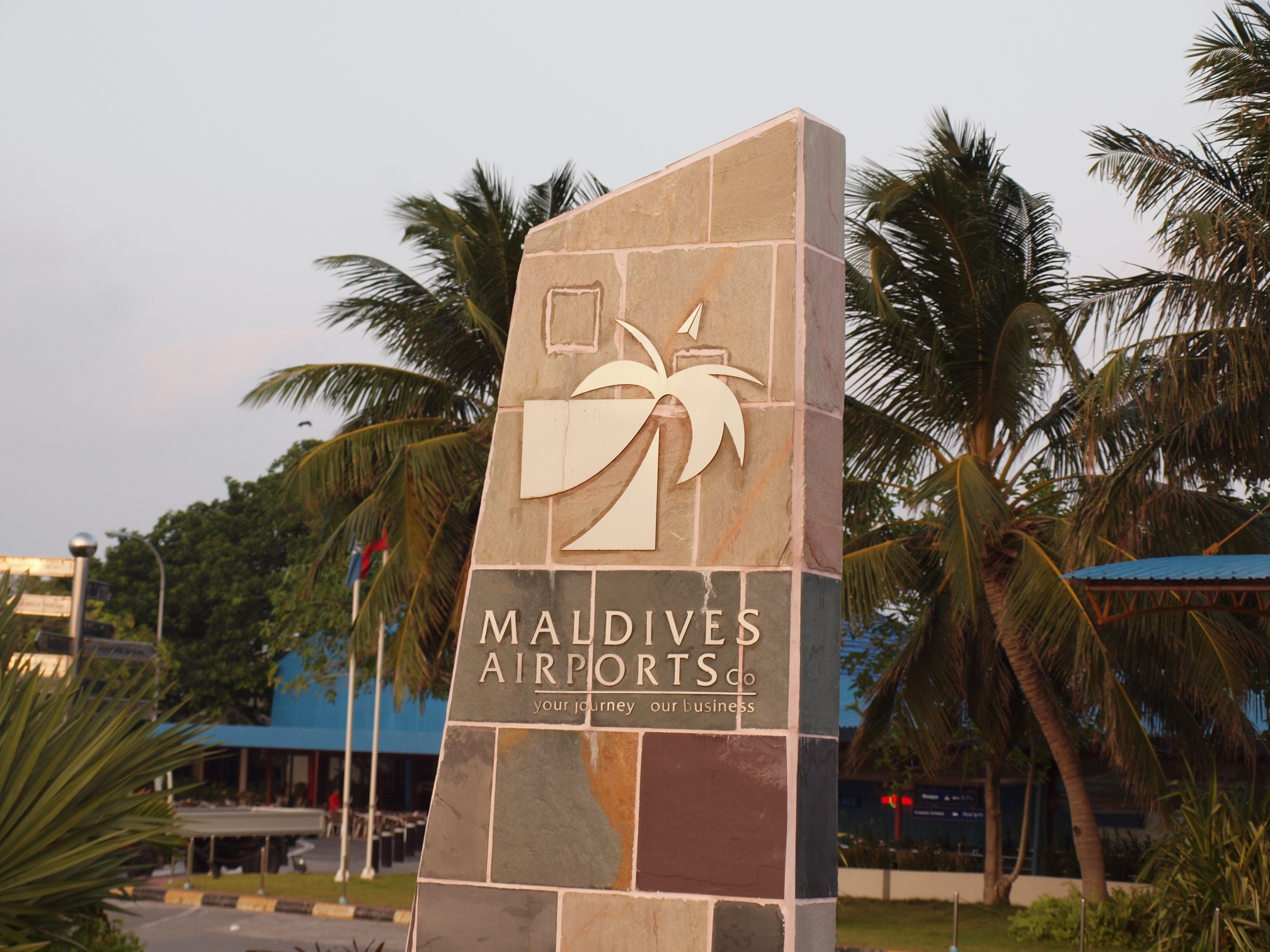
Maldives airport, Velana International Airport

The Velana International Airport is located on this island along with some official premises, e.g. Maldives Meteorological Service. The airport is served internationally by various holiday charter flights (mostly from Europe) and several scheduled carriers including Cathay Pacific, Hong Kong Airlines, Emirates, Qatar Airways, Etihad Airways, British Airways, Turkish Airlines, Singapore Airlines, Malaysia Airlines and SriLankan Airlines. In addition to serving as an international and domestic airport, Hulhulé is also home to the seaplane terminal operated by Trans Maldivian Airways. The island also serves as a hub for travellers wishing to connect to a domestic flight to the further outlying atolls, such as Laamu.

Before the airport was built, it was the home of the aboriginal Giraavaru people and other settlers who resided for convenience and agricultural purposes. People who lived in Hulhulé used to commute to Malé to sell their produce. In 1968, they were forced to abandon their ancestral home on Giraavaru island under an Islamic regulation that did not recognise communities with fewer than 40 adult males who could form a quorum at the Friday prayers.

The Giraavaru people were ferried across the atoll lagoon to Hulhulé Island. When the airport was extended, they were shifted across to Malé and housed in a few blocks in newly reclaimed areas in the Maafannu district.

== Location within Malé City ==
The airport island Hulhulé is located northeast of Malé Island, between it and new artificial residential Hulhumalé Island, to which it is connected by a causeway.

== Accommodation ==
One hotel, the Hulhule Island Hotel, is located on the island. This hotel is more for transit passengers over-nighting as opposed to a true resort hotel.

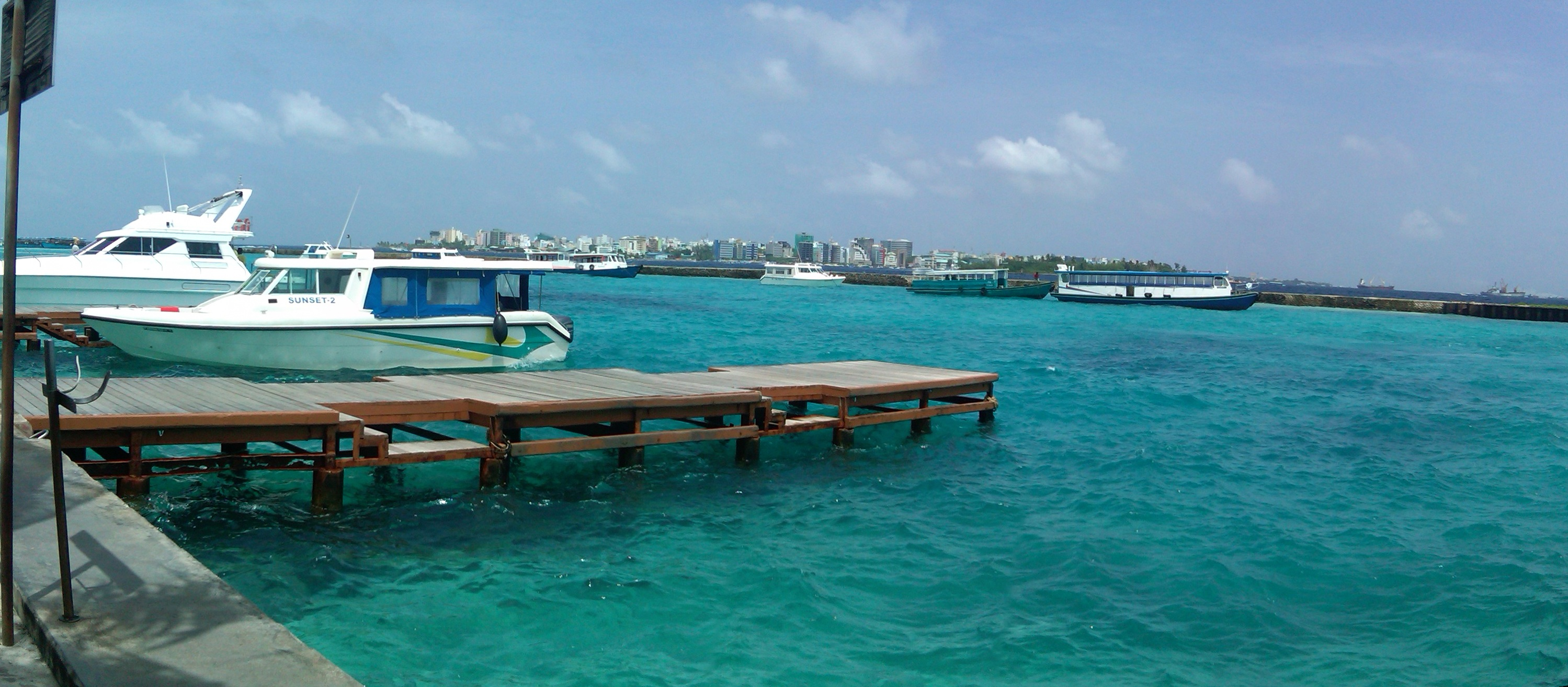
Panorama of capital Malé as seen from Hulhule' ferry terminal

== See also ==
- Hulhumalé - Artificial Island connected by road with Hulhulé Island
- Malé - Capital City of the Maldives which links a bridge to Hulhulé
