= Villa Nautica =

Hotel in Maldives

Coordinates: 4.28533°N 73.55362°E

Vialla Nautica formerly Paradise Island Resort is a five star resort situated on Lankanfinolhu island in the Malé Atoll (Kaafu Atoll) administrative division in the Republic of Maldives.

The resort is owned by the Villa Group. It was opened in November 1994 and is located in North Male' Atoll, which is 9.6 kilometres (6 miles) from Malé International Airport. Paradise Island is 932 metres (3,058 ft) long and 201 metres (659 ft) wide with total area 201.508 square metres (2,169 sq ft).
