= Biyadhoo =

Biyaadhoo
- Inhabited island
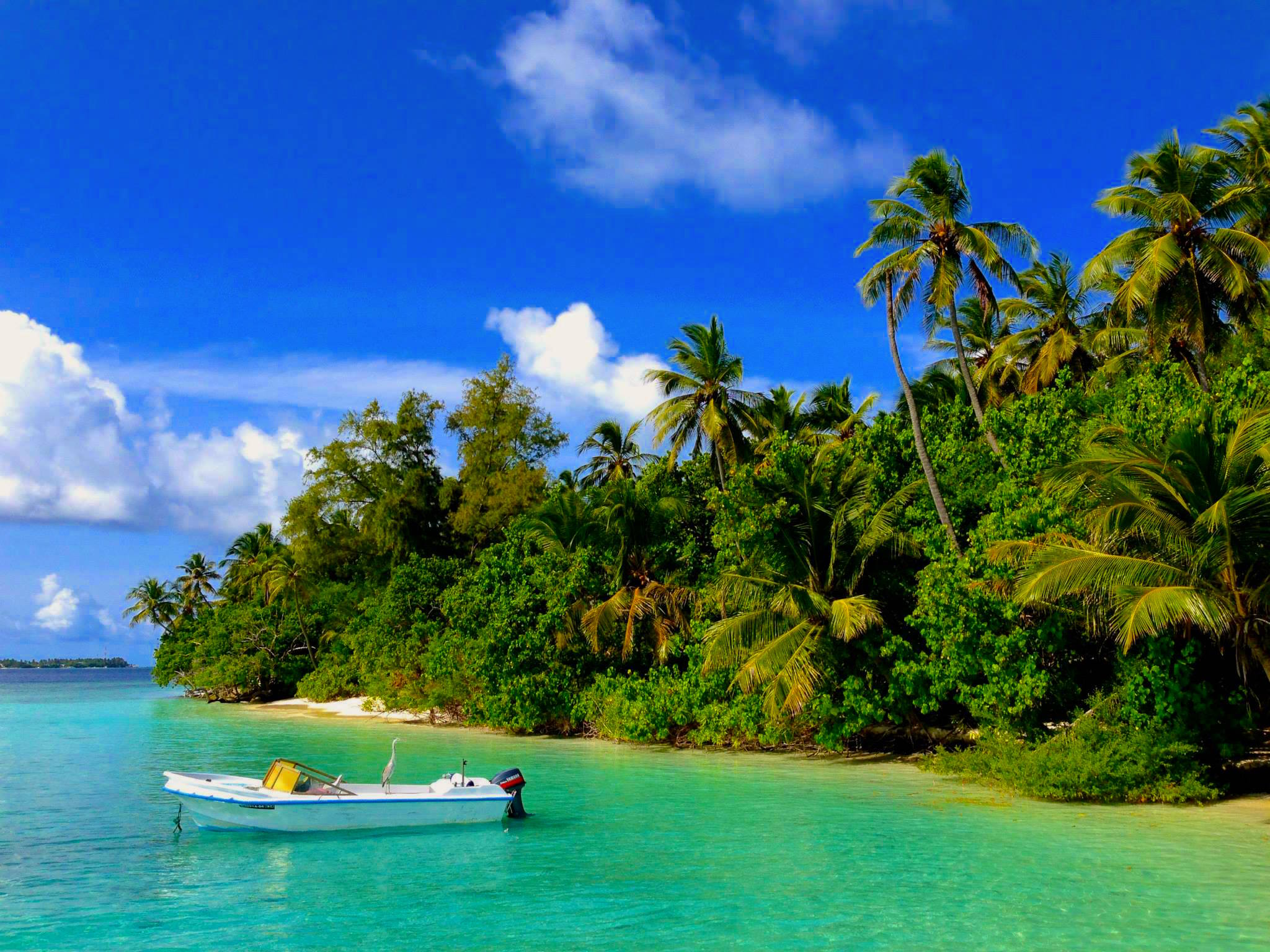
- Biyadhoo is famous for its crystal-clear turquoise water.

- Location in Maldives
- Coordinates: 3.9223°N 73.4564°E
- Country: Maldives
- Administrative atoll: Kaafu Atoll
- Distance to Malé: 29 km (18 mi)

Area
  - Total: 0.040 km^{2} (0.015 sq mi)
- Time zone: UTC+05:00 (MST)

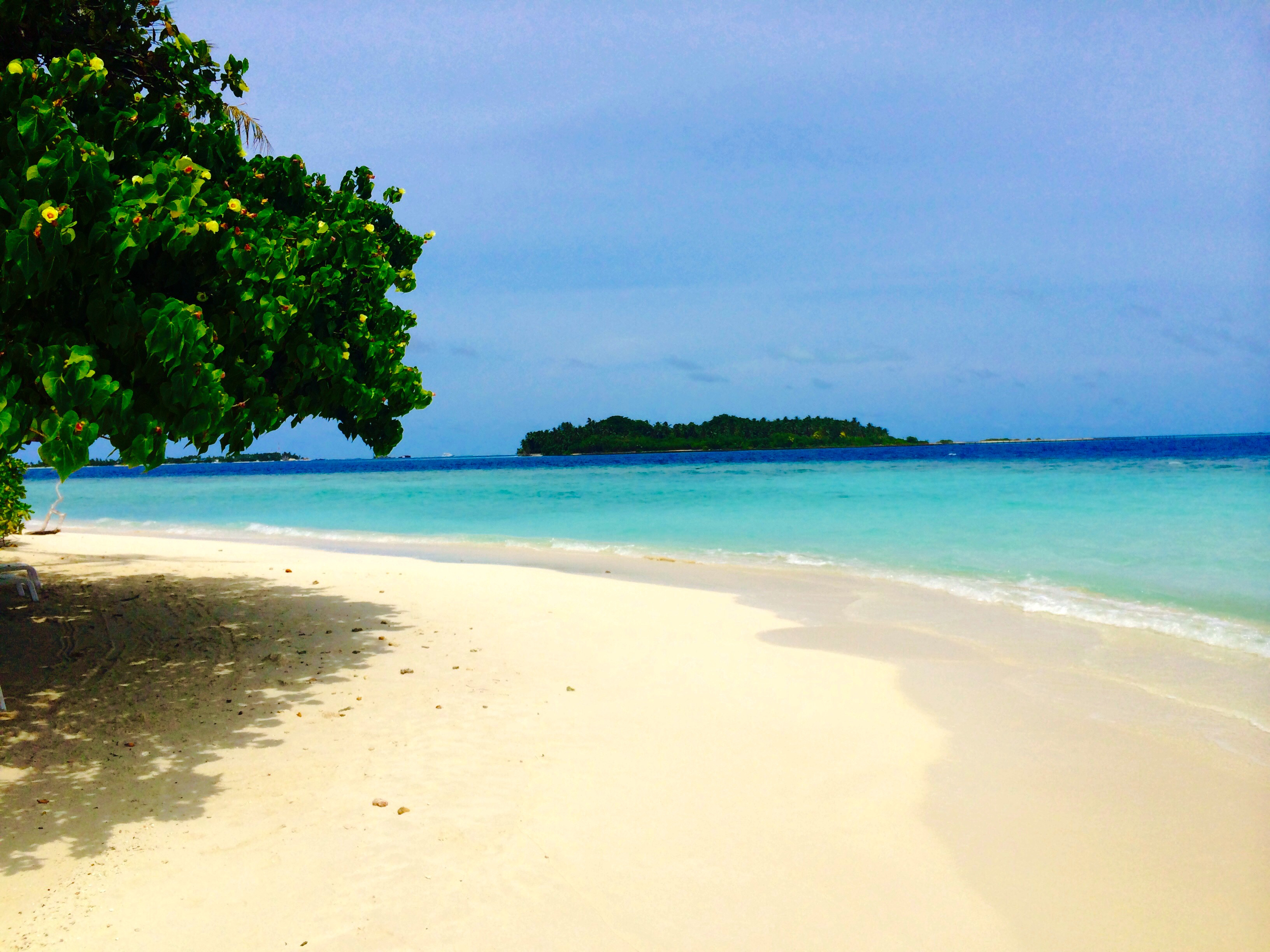
View of neighboring Villvaru Island from Biyadhoo.

Biyaadhoo or Biyadhoo is a circular ten-acre resort-island in South Malé Atoll in the administrative division Kaafu Atoll of the Maldives. The island is located 18 miles (28.9 km) south of Malé International Airport. It is located 0.62 miles from the island of Makunufushi, and only 330 yards from another resort-island, Villivaru. Both Biyaadhoo- and Villivaru islands are owned and managed by the Taj group from India. It is mostly made up by the Biyadhoo Island Resort, but remains a densely vegetated and forested island. The rich soil allows the cultivation of various fruits and vegetables, e.g. numerous coconut-, banana-, and mango trees grow on the island. Experts here have also been employed in growing vegetables hydroponically, some of the vegetables grown on the island includes tomatoes, cabbage, and cucumbers used by the resort in preparation of various buffets. There is one resort, a restaurant, spa, and one bar located on the island, all which are parts of the resort. There is also evening entertainment for guests several times a week.

The island of Biyadhoo is oftentimes referred to as a scuba-diving island, and its situation in South Malé Atoll gives access to many famous diving sites in the Maldives. The scuba-diving in the area is famous for sites such as Kandooma Thila, known for its dense schools of fish species, Kandooma Caves, which is famous for its soft corals, and the Protected Marine Area of Guraidhoo Kandu, which is a broad, fast channel. The Nautico Watersports Center runs the scuba-diving on both Villvaru- and Biyadhoo islands. It is close to shore all the way around, with an abundance of coral growth inside its lagoon as well as down the drop-off. Other water sport activities on the island includes snorkeling, windsurfing, catamaran sailing, and canoe paddling.
