= Thulusdhoo =

Island in Kaafu Atoll, Maldives

Thulusdhoo ތުލުސްދޫ
- Inhabited island
- Location in Maldives
- Coordinates: 04°22′22″N 73°38′56″E
- Country: Maldives
- Administrative atoll: Kaafu Atoll
- Distance to Malé: 26.81 km (16.66 mi)

Dimensions
  - Length: 1.580 km (0.982 mi)
  - Width: 0.650 km (0.404 mi)

Population (2022)
  - Total: 1,801 (including foreigners)
- Time zone: UTC+05:00 (MST)

Thulusdhoo (Dhivehi: ތުލުސްދޫ) is the capital of Kaafu Atoll, which is an administrative division of the Maldives.

The island is 26.81 km (17 mi; 14 nmi) northeast of the country's capital, Malé.

== Geography ==
The island is located in North Malé Atoll. Thulusdhoo is 1.580 km (0.982 mi) in length and just 0.680 km (0.423 mi) wide, with a total land area of 33 ha (82 acres).

== Demography ==
Historical population
Year	Pop.	±%
2006	1,148	—
2014	1,133	−1.3%
2022	1,801	+59.0%
2006-2022: Census populations Source:
