= Vaadhoo Kandu =

Water channel between two atolls

Vaadhoo Kandu is the channel between North Malé Atoll and South Malé Atoll, which are both within Kaafu Atoll in the Maldives.
