= Huvafen Fushi =

Huvafen Fushi Nakachchaafushi
- holiday island resort
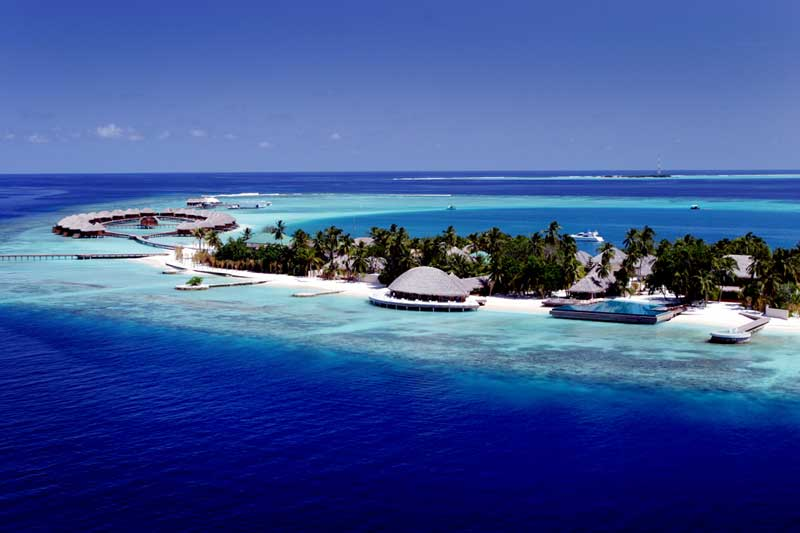
- Huvafen Fushi

- Location in Maldives
- Coordinates: 04°22′06″N 73°22′16″E
- Country: Maldives
- Administrative atoll: Kaafu Atoll
- Time zone: UTC+05:00 (MST)

Huvafen Fushi (Nakachcchaafushi) is a private resort island in the North Malé atoll, Kaafu, Maldives, Indian Ocean. Situated near the capital Malé and 30 minutes by speedboat from Malé International Airport, it opened in July 2004 and consists of a single island with 46 bungalows.
