= Meeru Island =

Meeru Meerufenfushi
- Island
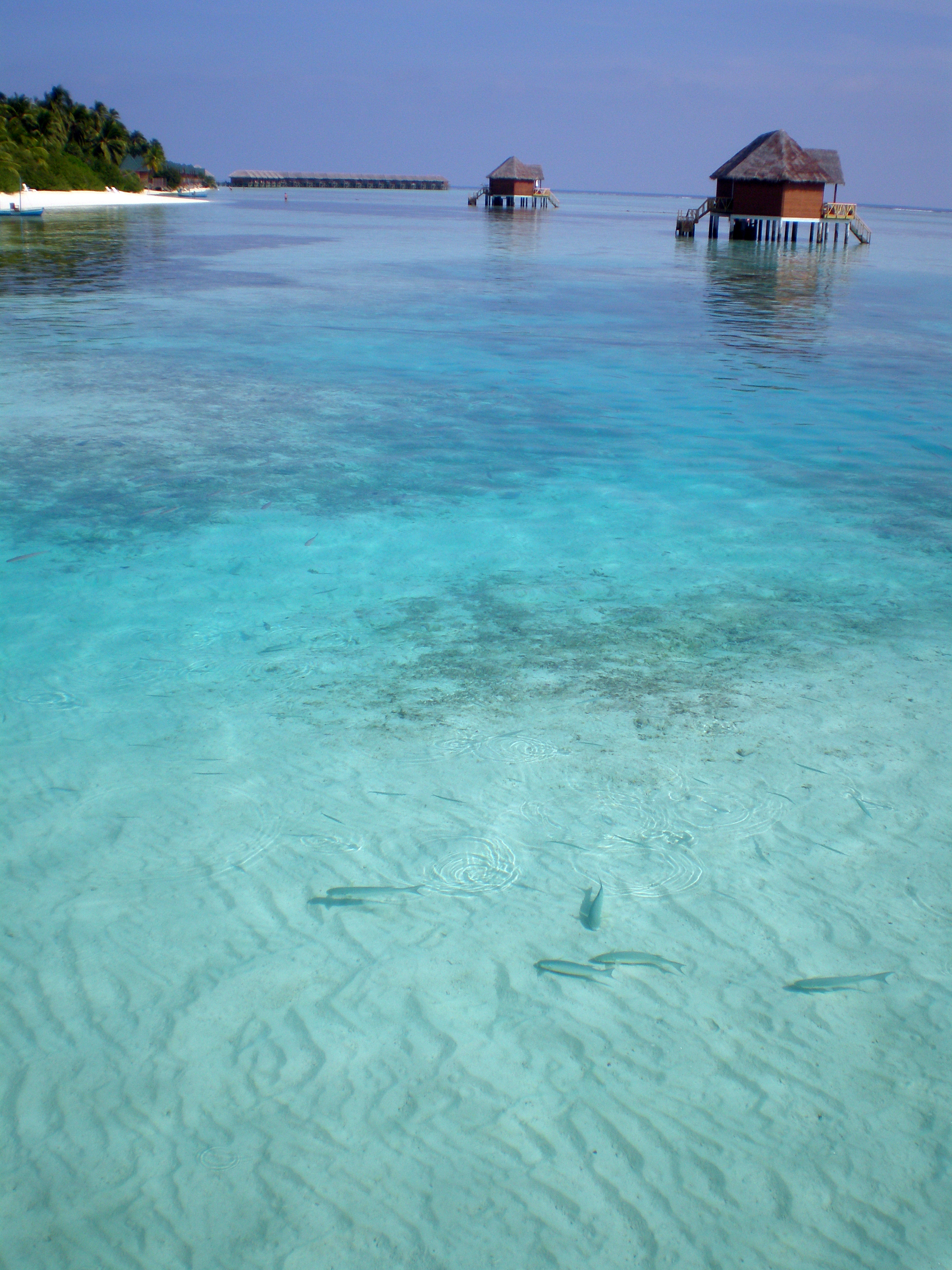
- Maldives Meeru island, East side

- Location in Maldives
- Coordinates: 4°26′28″N 73°42′40″E
- Country: Maldives
- Administrative atoll: Male Atoll
- Distance to Malé: 50 km (31 mi)

Population
  - Total: 0
- Time zone: UTC+05:00 (MST)

Meeru Island (also known as Meerufenfushi) is an island on the easternmost tip of North Malé Atoll (Kaafu Atoll) in the Maldives. It is located South West of Sri Lanka on the equator, some 50 kilometres from the capital Male'. The Meeru Maldives Resort Island has been operating as a private island resort on Meerufenfushi since 1976 and was one of the first tourist resorts in the republic of Maldives.

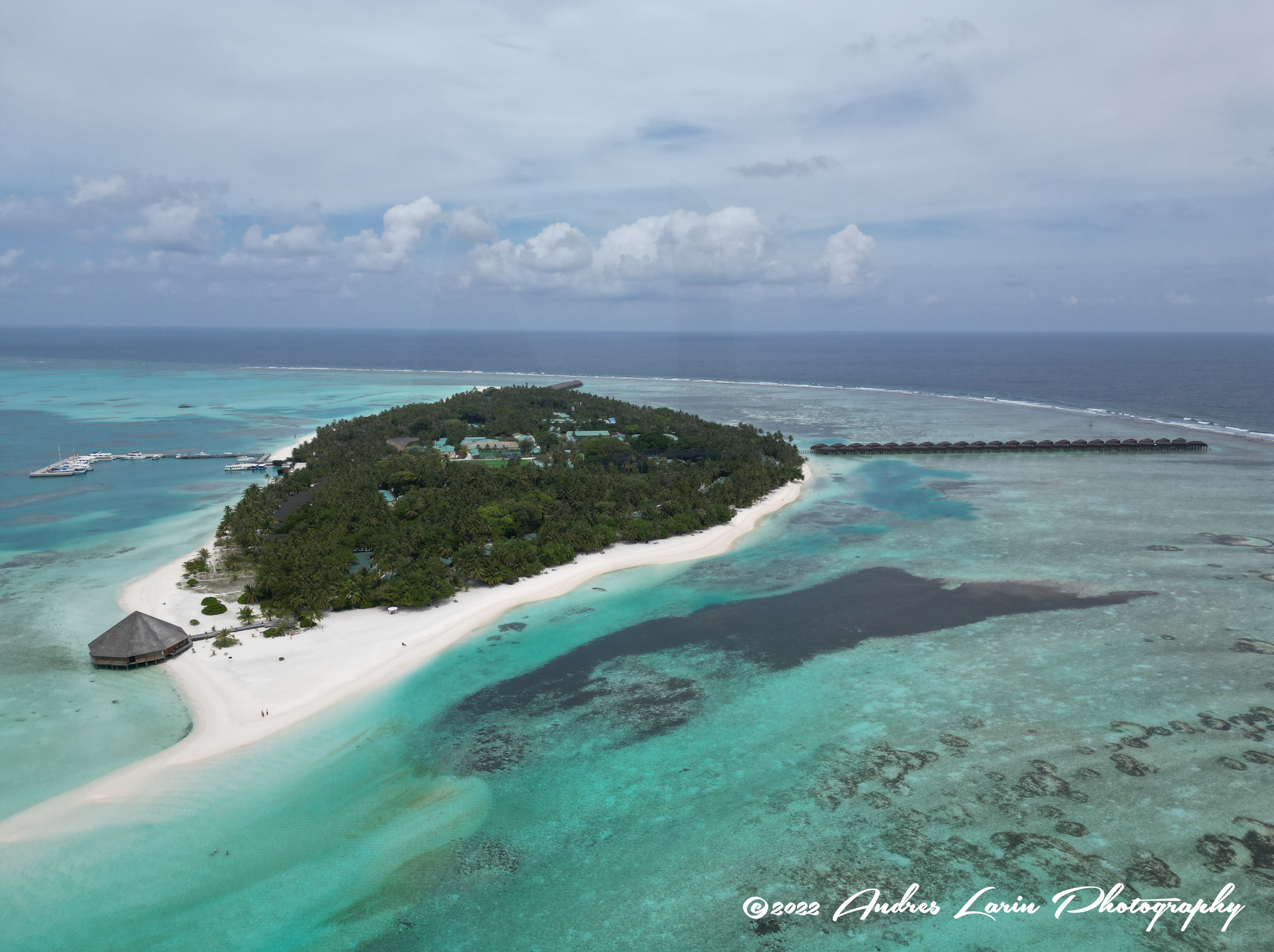
Drone shot of a Meeru island in 2023

The island is formed above peaks emerging from the depths of the ocean, upon layers of both living and dead coral, and remnants of other marine life. Coconut palms towering above dense shrubs and hardy plants protecting the shores from erosion are natural features. The island is 1200 meters long by 350 meters wide, about 32 hectares. A speedboat transfer from Velana International Airport is a 55-minute ride.
