= Kaafu Atoll =

- Atoll of the Maldives
- Malé Atoll
- Location of Kaafu in Maldives
- Country: Maldives
- Corresponding geographic atoll(s): Malé Atoll
- Location: 4°25′N 73°30′E
- Capital: Thulusdhoo

Government
  - Type: Atoll Council
  - President of Atoll Council: Ahmed Anees (PNC)

Population
  - Total: 19,238
- Letter code: H
- Dhivehi letter code: K (ކ)
  - Number of islands: 107
  - Inhabited islands: Dhiffushi; Gaafaru; Gulhi; Guraidhoo; Himmafushi; Huraa; Kaashidhoo; Maafushi; Malé; Thulusdhoo
  - Uninhabited islands and Male’: Aarah, Akirifushi, Asdhoo*, Baros*, Biyaadhoo*, male’, Bodubandos*, Bodufinolhu*, Boduhithi*, Boduhuraa, Bolifushi*, Dhigufinolhu, Dhoonidhoo, Ehrruh-haa, Enboodhoo*, Enboodhoofinolhu*, Eriyadhoo*, Farukolhufushi*, Feydhoofinolhu, Fihalhohi*, Funadhoo, Furan-nafushi*, Gasfinolhu*, Giraavaru*, Girifushi, Gulheegaathuhuraa, Helengeli*, Henbadhoo*, Huraagandu, Ihuru*, Kagi, Kalhuhuraa, Kandoomaafushi*, Kanduoih-giri, Kanifinolhu*, Kanuhuraa*, Kudabandos, Kudafinolhu, Kudahithi*, Kudahuraa, Lankanfinolhu*, Lankanfushi*, Lhohifushi*, Lhosfushi, Maadhoo, Madivaru, Mahaanaélhihuraa*, Makunudhoo*, Makunufushi, Maniyafushi, Medhufinolhu*, Meerufenfushi*, Nakachchaafushi*, Olhahali, Olhuveli*, Oligandufinolhu, Ran-naalhi*, Rasfari, Thanburudhoo, Thulhaagiri*, Vaadhoo*, Vaagali, Vabbinfaru*, Vabboahuraa, Vammaafushi, Velassaru*, Velifaru, Veliganduhuraa, Vihamanaafushi*, Villingilimathidhahuraa, Villingilivau*, Ziyaaraiffushi*
- Resort islands(*), airports(¤) and industrial islands are also considered uninhabited.

Kaafu Atoll is the code name (roughly equivalent to "Atoll K" in English) given to an administrative division in the Republic of Maldives which consists of the geographical atolls of Kaashidhoo Island, Gaafaru, North Malé Atoll and South Malé Atoll. As the two Malé Atolls are the main islands of the administrative district, the entire Kaafu Atoll administrative division is officially named Malé Atoll or Malé Atolhu in the Dhivehi language.

The capital of the administrative division is Thulusdhoo.

Although Malé, the capital of the Maldives, and the adjacent islands of Vilingili, Hulhule and Hulhumalé, are geographically part of the North Malé Atoll, they do not form part of the Kaafu Atoll administrative division and are a separate administrative division.

== Kaafu or Malé Atoll ==
Kaafu is a code letter of the Thaana alphabet used in the Dhivehi language assigned to one of the administrative divisions of the Maldives which is officially and traditionally known by the name Malé Atoll. The Thaana alphabet code names are not the names of the natural or geographical atolls of the Maldives which make up these divisions. These administrative divisions may consist of part of, a single or several natural atolls.

Malé Atoll is the name of two natural atolls which form part of the administrative division of Kaafu Atoll. The two Malé Atolls are North Malé Atoll and South Malé Atoll which are separated by the Vaadhoo Kandu. Malé and Thulusdhoo are both located in North Malé Atoll.

== Geography ==
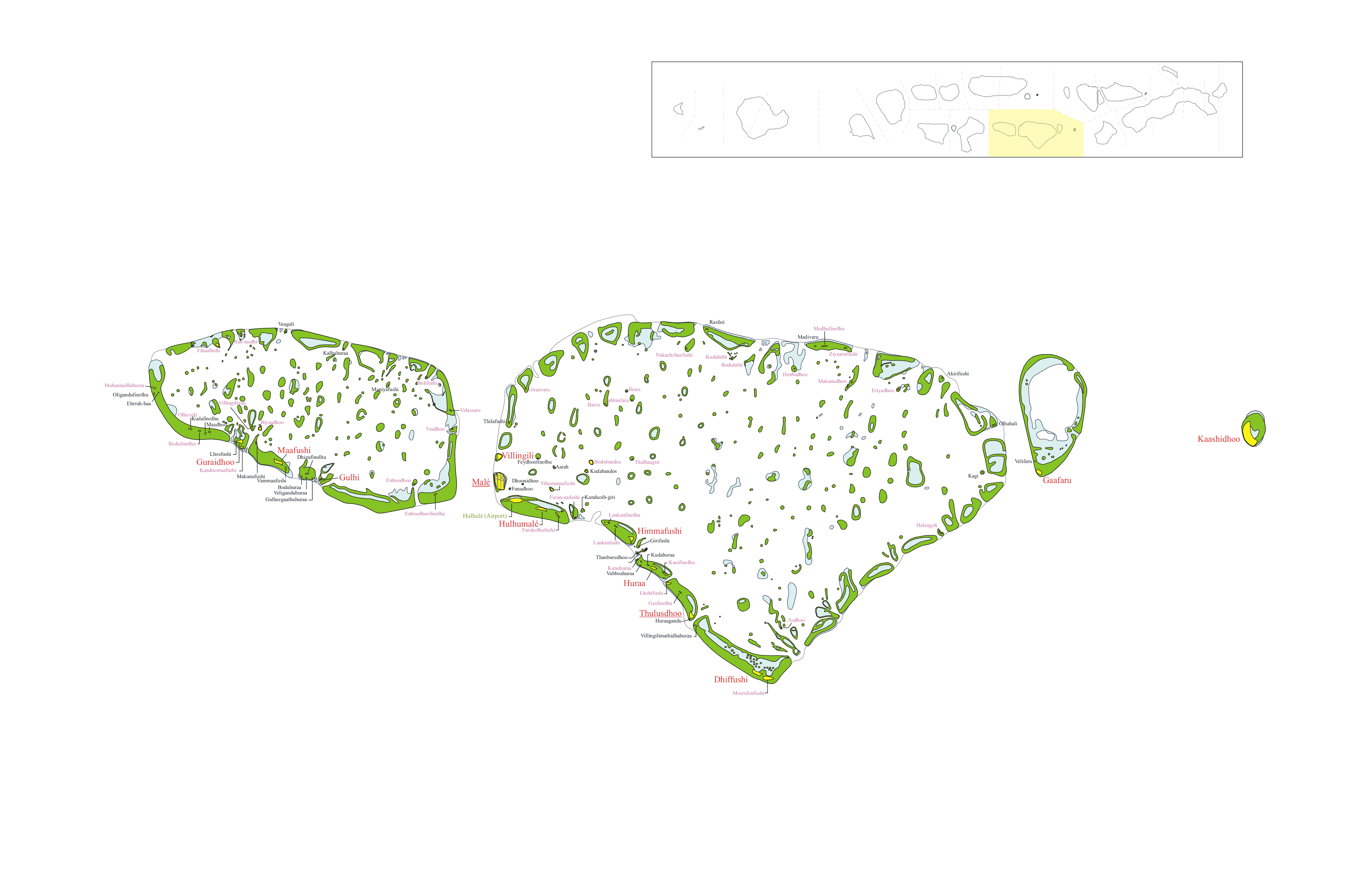
From left to right, South Malé Atoll, North Malé Atoll, Gaafaru and Kaashidhoo Island (north is to the right)

The Malé or Kaafu Atoll administrative division consists of the geographic or natural atolls of North Malé Atoll, South Malé Atoll, Gaafaru Atoll and Kaashidhoo Island. The atolls consists of Inhabited Islands and Uninhabited Island, a definition which includes resort islands, airport islands and industrial islands.

Although Malé, Hulhulé, Hulhumalé and Vilimalé are geographically part of North Malé Atoll, they are not part of the Kaafu Atoll administrative division and are part of the separate Malé City administrative division.

=== Inhabited islands ===
Name	Population	Coordinates	Geographic Atoll/Island	Remarks
Dhiffushi	967	4°26′31″N 73°42′49″E	North Malé Atoll	
Gaafaru	1,013	4°44′09″N 73°30′00″E	Gaafaru Atoll	
Gulhi	832	3°59′25″N 73°30′32″E	South Malé Atoll	
Guraidhoo	1,580	3°54′02″N 73°28′05″E	South Malé Atoll	
Himmafushi	1,334	4°18′32″N 73°34′16″E	North Malé Atoll	
Huraa	1,014	4°20′01″N 73°36′03″E	North Malé Atoll	
Kaashidhoo	1,728	4°57′20″N 73°27′40″E	Kaashidhoo Island	
Maafushi	2,631	3°56′26″N 73°29′22″E	South Malé Atoll	
Malé	211,908	4°10′31″N 73°30′32″E	North Malé Atoll	
Thulusdhoo	1,133	4°22′26″N 73°39′03″E	North Malé Atoll	Capital of the Malé Atoll administrative division.

=== Resort islands ===
Resort islands are classified as Uninhabited Islands which have been converted to become resorts.

The following are the resort islands, with the official name of the resort.

Name	Resort Name	Coordinates	Geographic Atoll	Remarks
Asdhoo	Asdu Sun Island Resort	4°27′58″N 73°39′40″E	North Malé Atoll	
Akirifushi	Oblu Select at Sangeli	4°38′15″N 73°24′2″E	North Malé Atoll	Opening in July 2018.
Baros	Baros Island Resort	4°17′05″N 73°25′38″E	North Malé Atoll	
Biyadhoo	Biyadhoo Island Resort	3°55′19″N 73°27′23″E	South Malé Atoll	
Bodubandos	Bandos Maldives Resort	4°16′10″N 73°29′29″E	North Malé Atoll	
Bodufinolhu	Fun Island Resort	3°51′27″N 73°27′23″E	South Malé Atoll	
Boduhithi	Coco Bodu Hithi Resort	4°25′49″N 73°23′04″E	North Malé Atoll	
Boduhuraa	Naladhu Private Island	3°58′17″N 73°30′23″E	South Malé Atoll	
Bolifushi	Jumeirah Vittaveli	4°05′45″N 73°24′05″E	South Malé Atoll	
Dhigufinolhu	Anantara Dhigu Maldives Resort	3°58′20″N 73°30′08″E	South Malé Atoll	
Enboodhoo	Embudu Village	4°05′02″N 73°30′43″E	South Malé Atoll	
Enboodhoofinolhu	Taj Exotica Resort & Spa	4°06′11″N 73°31′31″E	South Malé Atoll	
Eriyadhoo	smartline Eriyadu	4°35′24″N 73°24′52″E	North Malé Atoll	
Farukolhufushi	Formerly Club Med and then Club Faru	4°13′51″N 73°32′38″E	North Malé Atoll	Resort closed – island now part of Hulhumalé.
Fihalhohi	Fihalhohi Island Resort	3°52′38″N 73°22′01″E	South Malé Atoll	
Furan-nafushi	The Sheraton Maldives Full Moon Resort & Spa	4°14′59″N 73°32′44″E	North Malé Atoll	
Gasfinolhu	Club Med The Finolhu Villas	4°21′40″N 73°37′34″E	North Malé Atoll	
Giraavaru	Centara Ras Fushi Resort & Spa Maldives	4°12′01″N 73°24′46″E	North Malé Atoll	
Helengeli	Oblu by Atmosphere at Helengeli	4°38′04″N 73°33′48″E	North Malé Atoll	
Henbadhoo	Vivanta by Taj - Coral Reef Maldives	4°28′53″N 73°23′35″E	North Malé Atoll	
Ihuru	Angsana Ihuru	4°18′24″N 73°24′57″E	North Malé Atoll	
Kandoomaafushi	Holiday Inn Resort Kandooma	3°54′12″N 73°28′24″E	South Malé Atoll	
Kanifinolhu	Club Med Kani	4°20′36″N 73°36′29″E	North Malé Atoll	
Kanuhuraa	Cinnamon Dhonveli Maldives	4°19′06″N 73°35′30″E	North Malé Atoll	
Kodhipparu	Grand Park Kodhipparu	4°15′35″N 73°22′48″E	North Malé Atoll	
Kudabandos	Malahini Kuda Bandos	4°15′49″N 73°29′59″E	North Malé Atoll	
Kudahithi	Coco Prive	4°25′01″N 73°22′48″E	North Malé Atoll	
Kudahuraa	Four Seasons Resort	4°19′41″N 73°35′51″E	North Malé Atoll	
Lankanfinolhu	Villa Nautica	4°17′06″N 73°33′13″E	North Malé Atoll	
Lhohifushi	Adaaran Select Hudhuranfushi	4°21′02″N 73°37′05″E	North Malé Atoll	
Maadhoo	Ozen by Atmosphere at Madhoo	3°52′15″N 73°27′31″E	South Malé Atoll	
Mahaanaélhihuraa	Rihiveli The Dream by Save The Dream Maldives (Note: Since 1983, new management since May 2018 under Rihiveli The Dream Archived 2020-12-22 at the Wayback Machine.)	3°48′43″N 73°24′41″E	South Malé Atoll	
Makunudhoo	Makunudu Island	4°32′33″N 73°24′20″E	North Malé Atoll	
Makunufushi	Como Coco Island	3°55′04″N 73°28′11″E	South Malé Atoll	
Medhufinolhu	One & Only Reethi Rah	4°30′50″N 73°22′09″E	North Malé Atoll	
Meerufenfushi	Meeru Island Resort & Spa	4°27′13″N 73°43′00″E	North Malé Atoll	
Nakachchaafushi	Huvafen Fushi Maldives	4°22′06″N 73°22′12″E	North Malé Atoll	
Olhahali/Olhuhali	Lux* North Malé Atoll	4°41′23″N 73°27′04″E	North Malé Atoll	Opening October 2018.
Olhuveli	Olhuveli Beach & Spa	3°51′01″N 73°27′18″E	South Malé Atoll	
Ran-naalhi	Adaaran Club Rannalhi	3°54′11″N 73°21′27″E	South Malé Atoll	
Thulhaagiri	Thulhagiri Island Resort and Spa Maldives	4°18′41″N 73°29′14″E	North Malé Atoll	
Vaadhoo	Adaaran Prestige Vadoo	4°07′26″N 73°27′26″E	South Malé Atoll	
Vabbinfaru	Banyan Tree Vabbinfaru	4°18′35″N 73°25′26″E	North Malé Atoll	
Velassaru	Velassaru Maldives	4°07′17″N 73°26′13″E	South Malé Atoll	
Veliganduhuraa	Anantara Veli Maldives	3°58′2″N 73°30′19″E	South Malé Atoll	
Vihamanaafushi	Kurumba Maldives	4°13′36″N 73°31′11″E	North Malé Atoll	The first resort island in the Maldives.
Villingilivaru	Formerly Dream Island Maldives	3°54′51″N 73°27′20″E	South Malé Atoll	This resort is closed.
Ziyaaraiffushi	Summer Island Maldives	4°31′59″N 73°22′20″E	North Malé Atoll	

=== Other Uninhabited Islands ===
Name	Current use	Coordinates	Geographic Atoll/Island	Remarks
Aarah		4°13′48″N 73°29′40″E	North Malé Atoll	
Akirifushi		4°38′15″N 73°24′2″E	North Malé Atoll	
Dhoonidhoo	Detention facility	4°11′49″N 73°30′49″E	North Malé Atoll	
Erruh-huraa		3°48′53″N 73°24′58″E	South Malé Atoll	
Feydhoofinolhu		4°12′50″N 73°29′8″E	North Malé Atoll	
Funadhoo	Oil storage	4°11′1″N 73°31′4″E	North Malé Atoll	
Girifushi	Military Base	4°19′6″N 73°34′42″E	North Malé Atoll	
Gulheegaathuhuraa	Staff accommodation for nearby resort	3°58′36″N 73°30′23″E	South Malé Atoll	
Huraagandu		4°21′58″N 73°37′20″E	North Malé Atoll	
Kagi		4°40′37″N 73°30′3″E	North Malé Atoll	
Kalhuhuraa		4°0′34″N 73°22′22″E	South Malé Atoll	
Kanduoih-giri		4°15′28″N 73°32′26″E	North Malé Atoll	
Kudafinolhu		3°51′54″N 73°27′30″E	South Malé Atoll	
Lhosfushi		3°53′49″N 73°28′11″E	South Malé Atoll	
Madivaru		4°30′2″N 73°22′5″E	North Malé Atoll	
Maniyafushi		4°3′21″N 73°24′40″E	South Malé Atoll	
Oligandufinolhu		3°48′42″N 73°25′4″E	South Malé Atoll	
Rasfari		4°23′40″N 73°21′5″E	North Malé Atoll	
Thanburudhoo		4°18′55″N 73°35′3″E	North Malé Atoll	
Thilafushi	Industrial	4°11′0″N 73°26′44″E	North Malé Atoll	
Thunbafushi	Industrial	4°35′23″N 73°35′23″E	North Malé Atoll	
Vaagali		3°56′54″N 73°21′22″E	South Malé Atoll	
Vabboahuraa		4°19′9″N 73°35′46″E	North Malé Atoll	
Vammaafushi		3°56′55″N 73°29′46″E	North Malé Atoll	
Velifaru			Gaafaru Atoll	
Villingilimathidhahuraa		4°22′37″N 73°39′46″E	North Malé Atoll	

== Gallery ==
North Malé Atoll

South Malé Atoll

Island of Lankanfushi from Lankanfinolhu- two of the tourist resorts

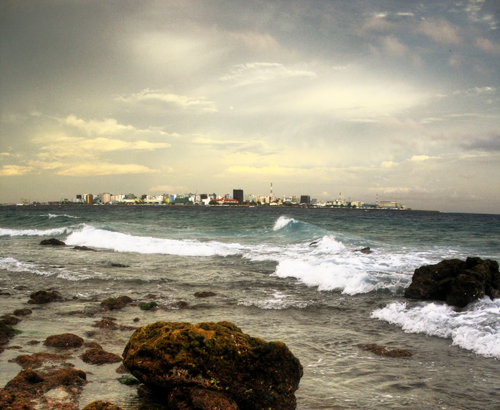
Malé, the capital of the Maldives, as viewed from Vilingilli island

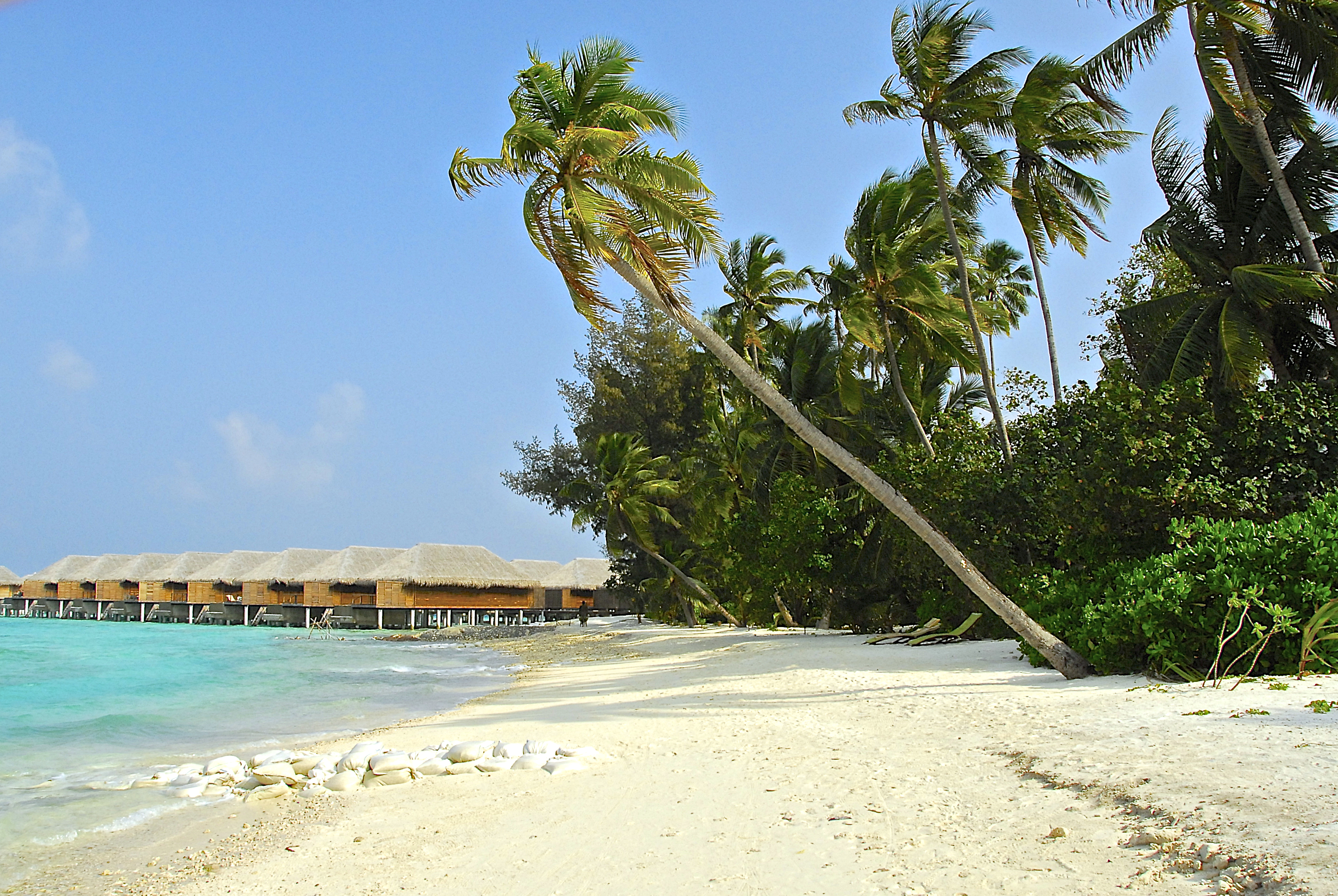

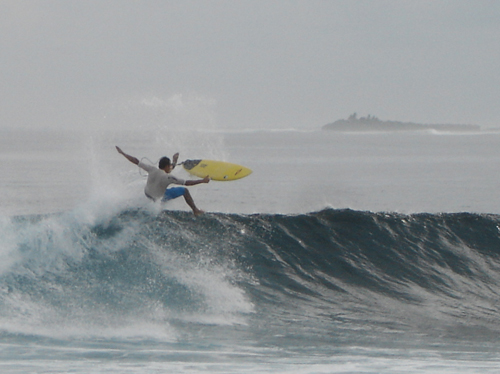
Surfing at Lohi's Break, off Lhohifushi island

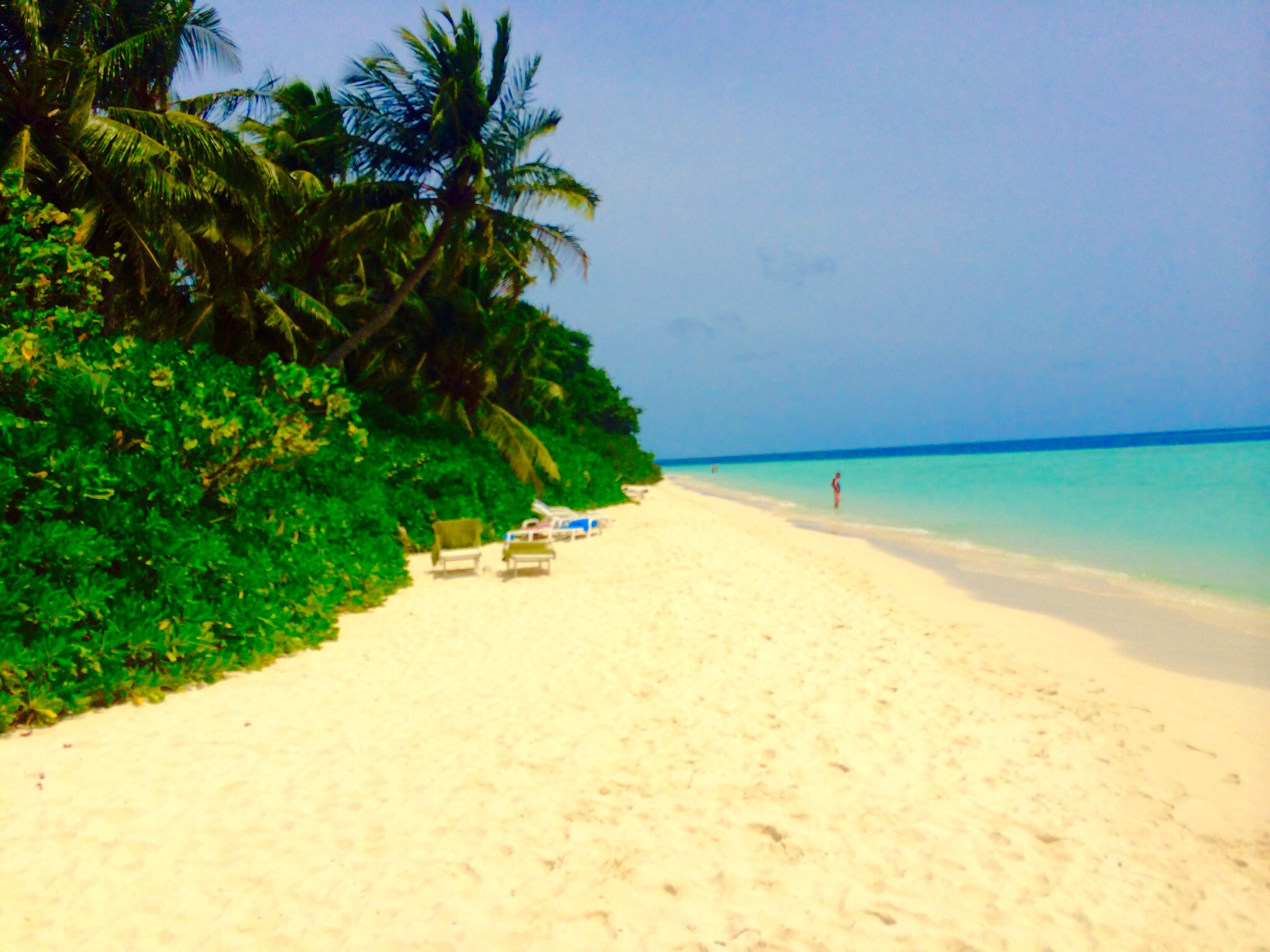
Beach on Biyaadhoo Island, 2014.

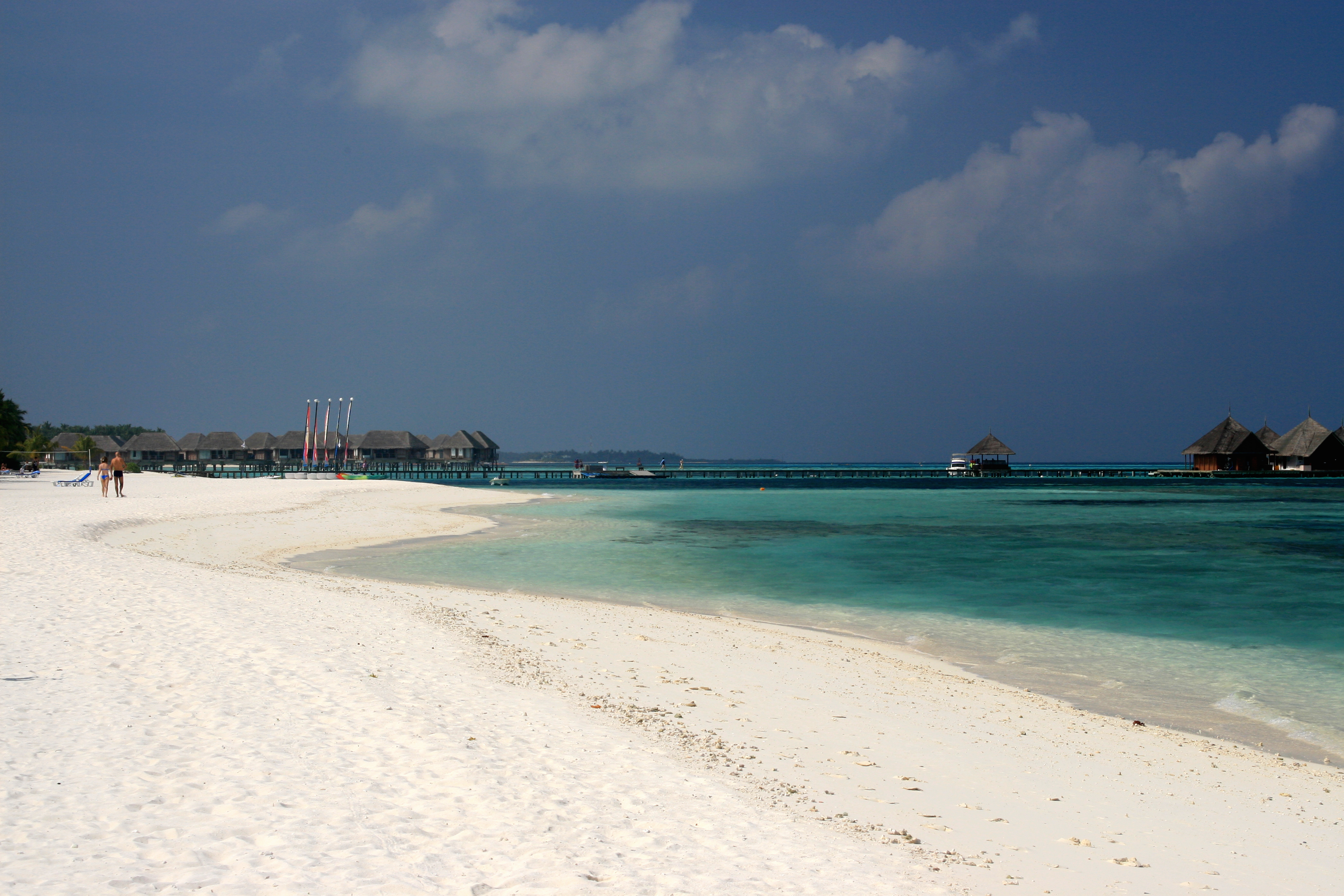
Kanifinolhu Islet

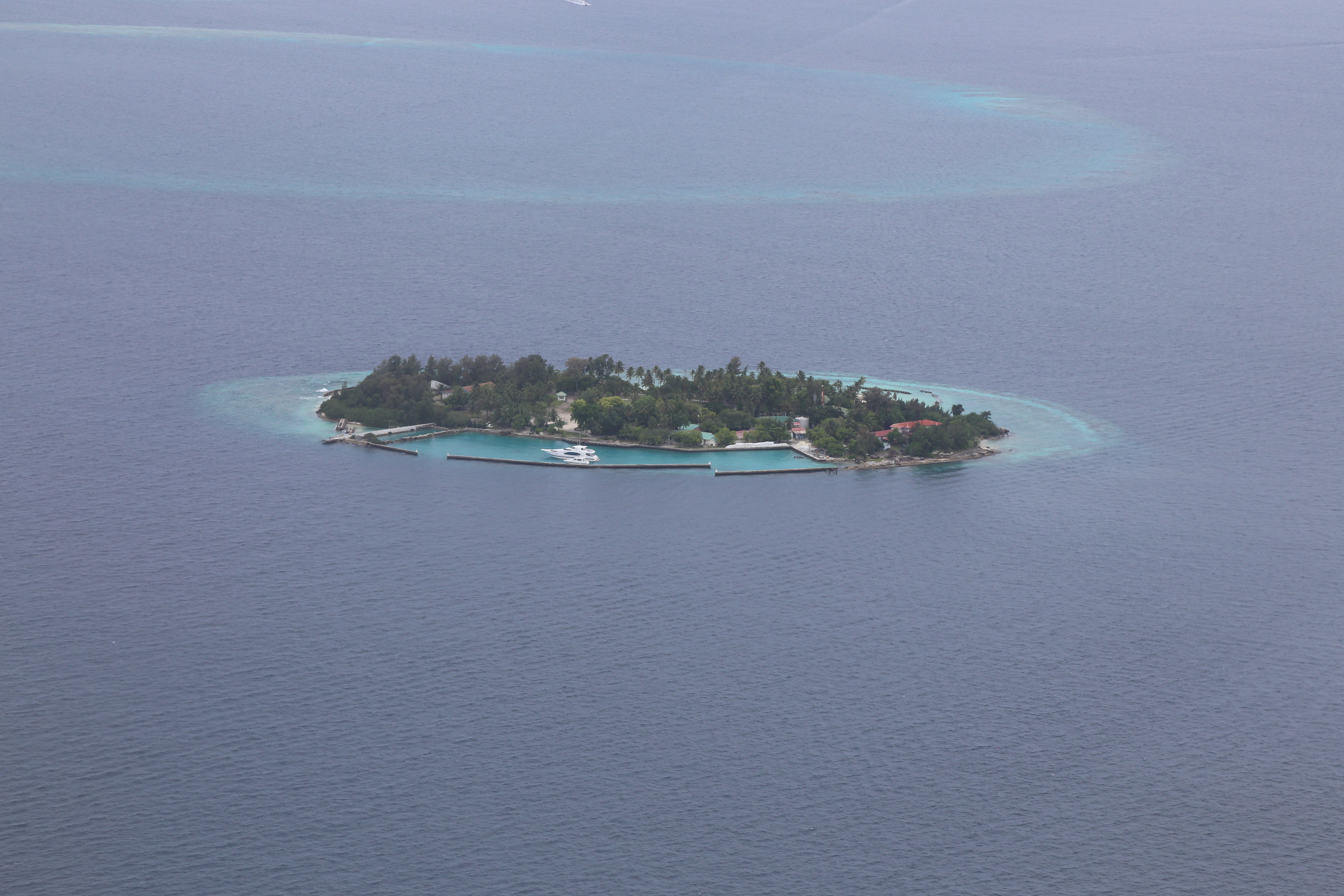
Aarah Island

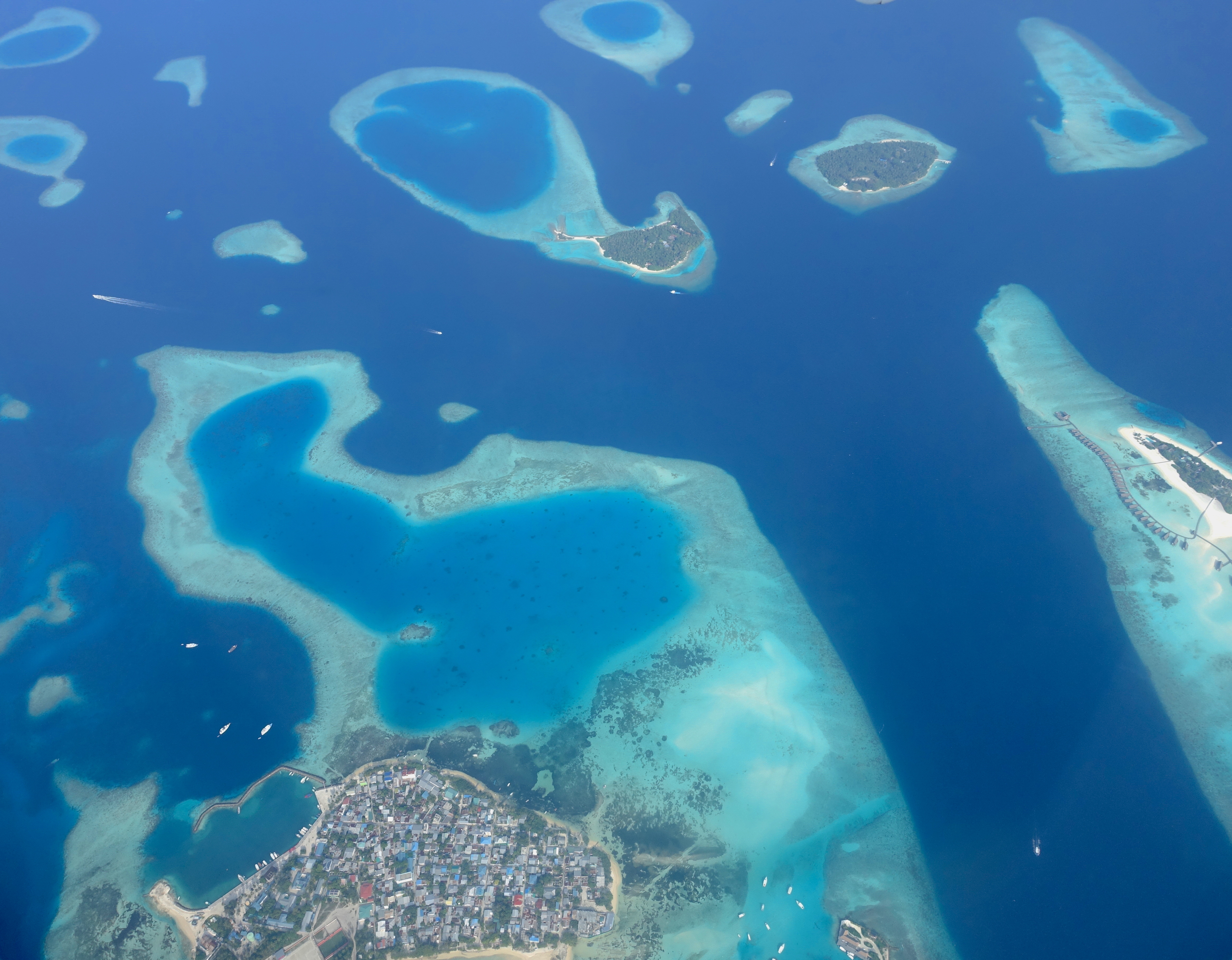
Aerial view of Guraidhoo Island in South Malé Atoll
