= Tivaru =

First settlers of the Minicoy island of Lakshadweep

Tivaru (ތީވަރު) or Dweepukar are said to be the first settlers of the Minicoy island of Lakshadweep off the Indian mainland.

== History ==
The origin of the Tivaru is unknown. Clarence Malony suggests that they could be Dravidians from south India but there is no evidence . Local oral tradition says that when Dhivehis came to these islands, the Tivaru who had really already settled in these islands migrated to Sri Lanka, except for those who remained on Giraavaru.

== See also ==
- Dravidians
- Thiyyar history
