= Giraavaru (Kaafu Atoll) =

Giraavaru ގިރާވަރު
- Uninhabited island
- Location in Maldives
- Coordinates: 4°12′02″N 73°24′46″E
- Country: Maldives
- Geographic atoll: Malé Atoll
- Administrative atoll: Kaafu Atoll
- Distance to Malé: 55.7 km (34.6 mi)

Dimensions
  - Length: 0.675 km (0.419 mi)
  - Width: 0.200 km (0.124 mi)
- Time zone: UTC+05:00 (MST)

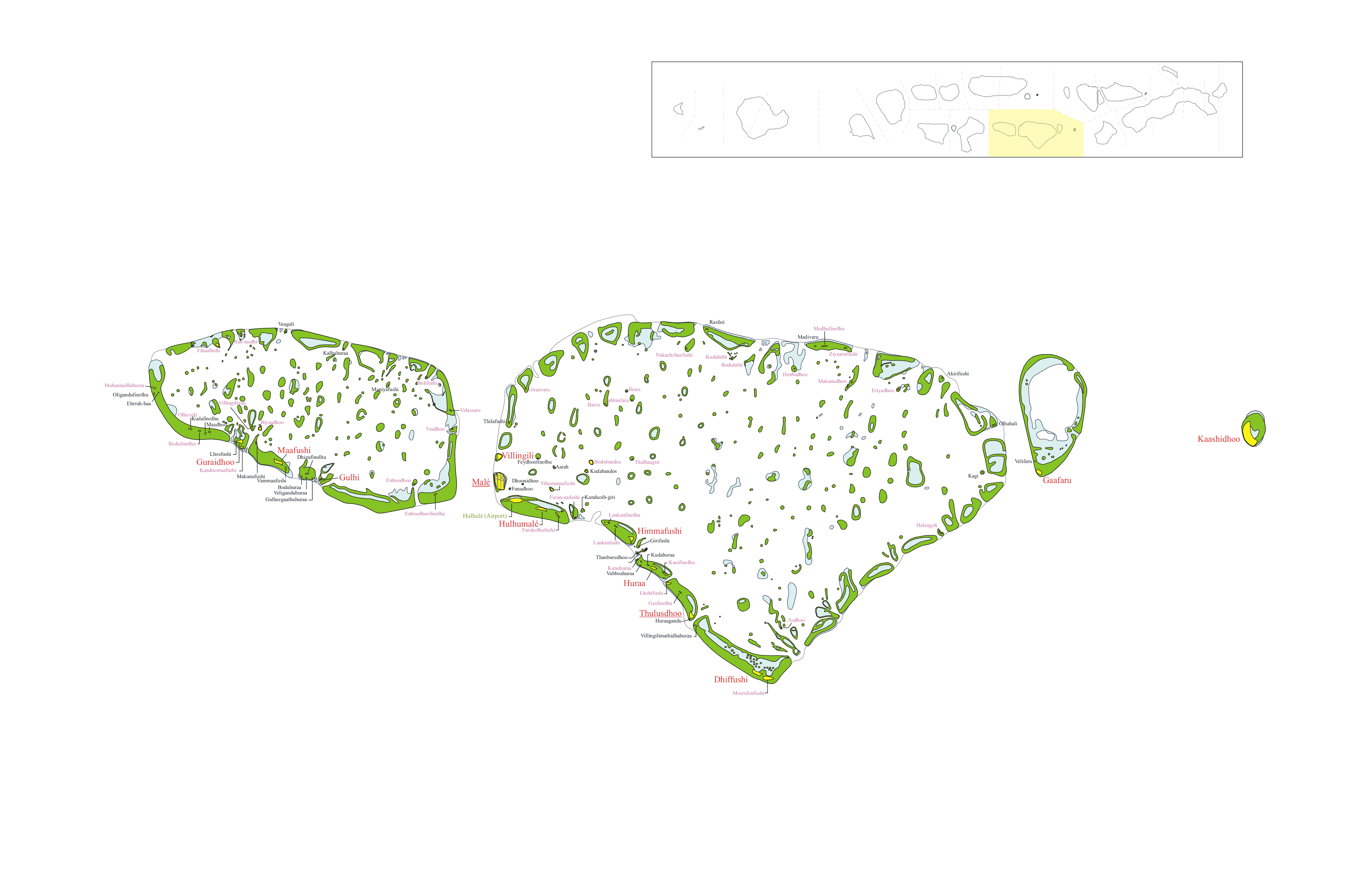
Kaafu Atoll

Giraavaru is an island of Malé Atoll (the administrative Kaafu Atoll) nowadays hosting a tourist resort. It is located on the southwestern fringe of the lagoon of North Malé Atoll. It was inhabited in the past by the community known as Giraavaru people (or Tivaru people).

== Historical and anthropological facts ==
The Giraavaru islanders had certain customs of their own, the women, for example, used to wear distinctive white cloth patchwork bands on the neckpiece of their libaas dress (boavalhu) instead of the usual Maldivian golden or silvery thread designs.

In 1968 the island was depopulated due to heavy erosion and reduction of the community to a few members. The Giravaru people were resettled in nearby Hulhule Island, at the eastern edge of the Male' Atoll lagoon. At the time of depopulation there were only a few coconut trees growing on Giraavaru and the water in the wells had become saline.

When the airport at Hulhule was expanded they were relocated in the western end of Maafanu district in Malé. The Giraavaru culture assimilated into the wider Malé society through inter-marriage after only about two generations.

It is unlikely that the Giraavaru islanders were the only early settlers in the Maldives, as it is often claimed on the basis of myths and legends. From the anthropological point of view there were, and still are, other distinctive groups of people in the Maldives, like in Huvadhu Atoll for example, having their particular customs, manners and even speaking markedly different language forms. However, the Giraavaru islanders have attracted much more attention owing to their proximity to the capital.

Malé islanders and the royal court were fascinated by the distinctiveness of the Giraavaru islanders for centuries and thus they became locally an iconic people group.

== Reclamation ==
In 2025, work commenced on land reclamation in the eastern side of the lagoon, intended as a way to relieve the overcrowding in Malé. The area will be connected to Malé by the Thilamalé Bridge. The natural island of Giraavaru is now a resort.
