= Maafushi (Kaafu Atoll) =

Island in Kaafu Atoll, Maldives

Maafushi މާފުށި
- Inhabited island
- Location in Maldives
- Coordinates: 03°56′25″N 73°29′20″E
- Country: Maldives
- Administrative atoll: Kaafu Atoll
- Distance to Malé: 26.08 km (16.21 mi)

Dimensions
  - Length: 1.275 km (0.792 mi)
  - Width: 0.260 km (0.162 mi)

Population (2022)
  - Total: 4,471 (including foreigners)
- Time zone: UTC+05:00 (MST)

Maafushi (Dhivehi: މާފުށި) is one of the inhabited islands of Kaafu Atoll in the Maldives.

The island's proximity to Malé and its transport hubs has allowed Maafushi to become a popular destination for tourists visiting local islands.

== History ==
Maafushi was heavily damaged by the 2004 tsunami which impacted over 100,000 of the Maldives 300,000 population. The International Federation of Red Cross and Red Crescent Societies, supported by the Irish and American Red Cross Societies, began work on a main sewage system on 10 August 2006. The International Federation has also funded the building of homes for those who lost theirs during the tsunami.

== Geography ==
The island is 26.08 km (16 mi; 14 nmi) south of the country's capital, Malé.

== Demography ==
Historical population
Year	Pop.	±%
2006	2,000	—
2014	2,631	+31.5%
2022	4,471	+69.9%
2006-2022: Census populations Source:

According to the latest Census conducted in 2022, the total population of Maafushi is at 4,471 out of which 3,195 are Maldivians, and 1,276 foreigners.

== Governance ==
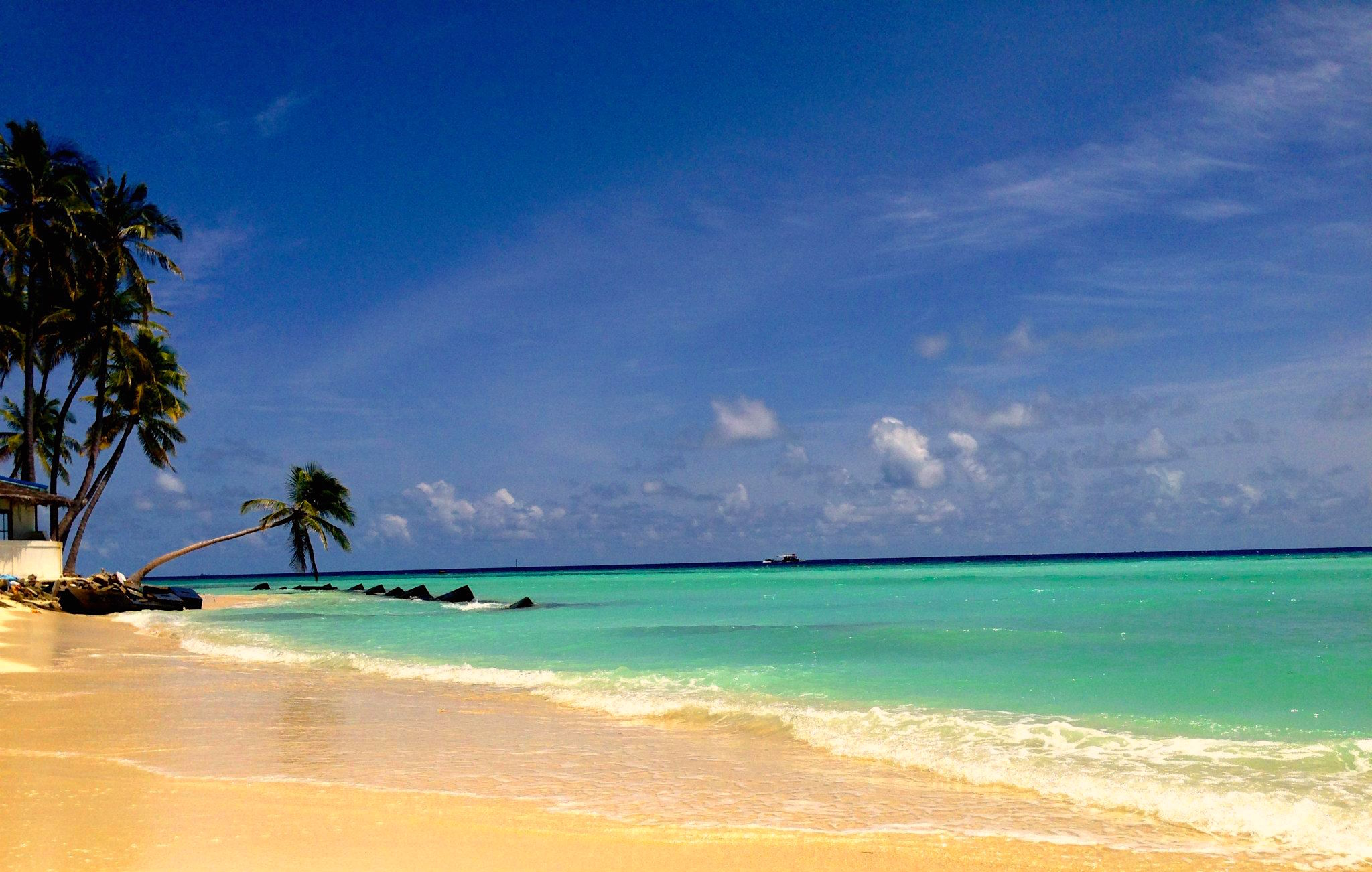
A photo of the beach outside WhiteShell Beach Inn.

In accordance with the recently passed Decentralization Act of Maldives, Maafushi is governed by an elected Island Council composed of five Councillors. The council is headed by the President of the council. The Island Council reports to the Local Government Authority (LGA). As democracy and decentralization is at the infant stage in Maldives, the councillors, and the government find it difficult to deal with important issues like land, and resource utilization. There are still many legal issues that need to be settled, before the island council can confidently perform its duties independently. There is also the issue of lack of know-how among the councillors. Most councillors are without basic education, and find it difficult to manage the day-to-day affairs of the island.

== Economy ==
Tourists from neighboring resort islands also visit Maafushi for island hopping and Maafushi provides them with shopping opportunity with souvenir shops at assigned areas of the island.

=== Tourism ===
==== Guest houses ====
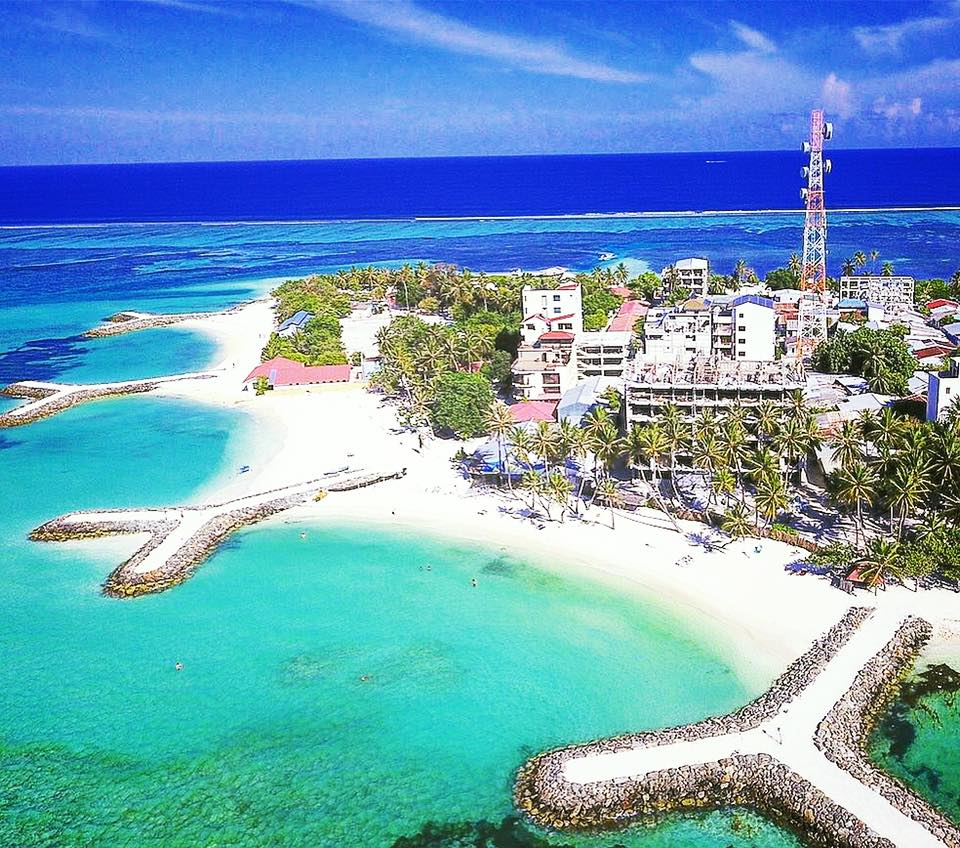

As of August 2016 there were more than 55 guest houses in Maafushi and it is the only local inhabited island with most number of guest houses and guest beds in the country.

Evolution of guest houses in Maafushi

- 18/12/2017 December: 72 Guest houses
- 09/2016 August: 55 guest houses
- 12/2015 December: 40 guest houses

== Transport ==
Maafushi is connected by ferry service from Malé, which tourists can arrive through Velana International Airport.

== Gallery ==
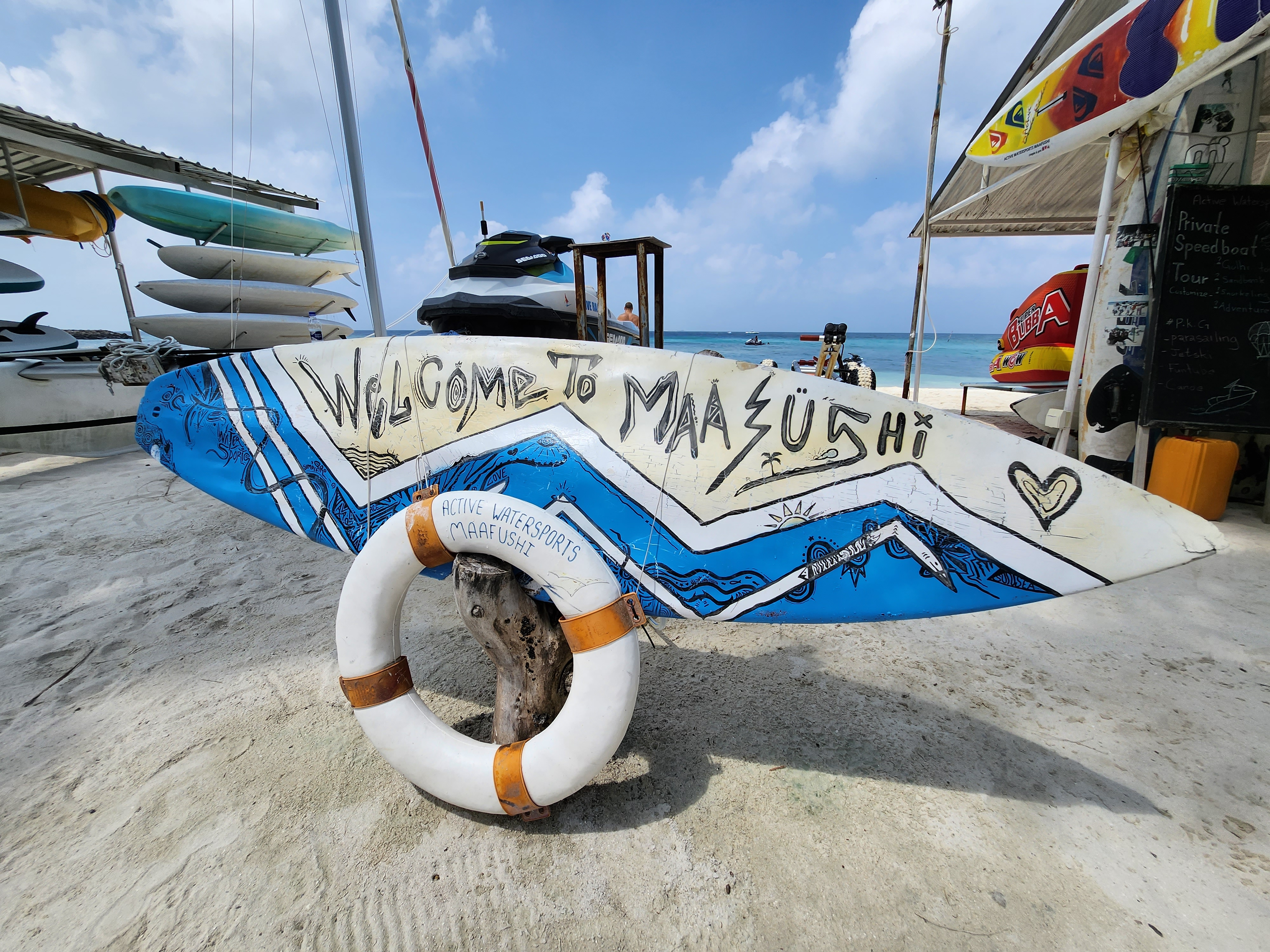
Welcome to Maafushi

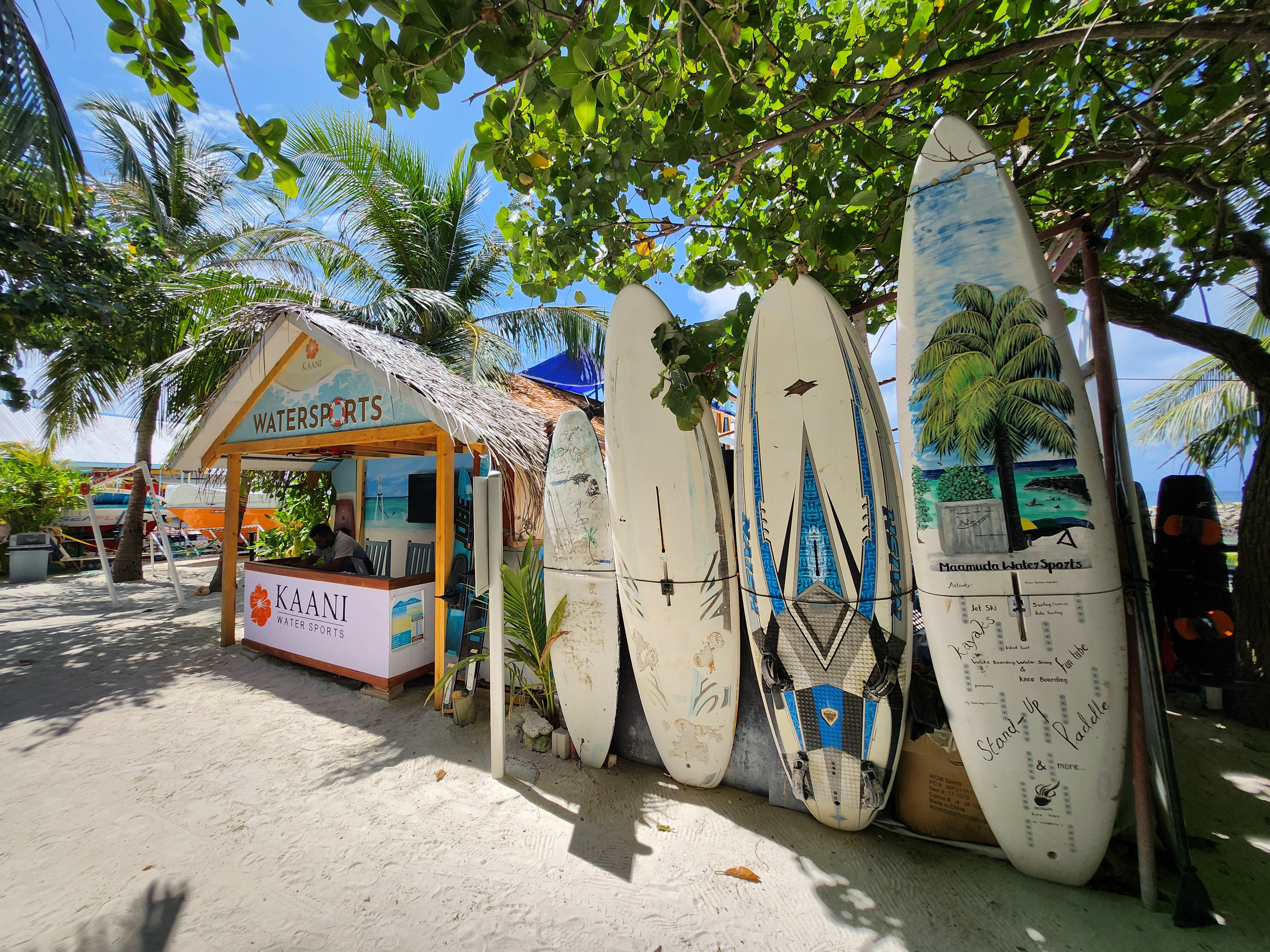
Kaani Watersports

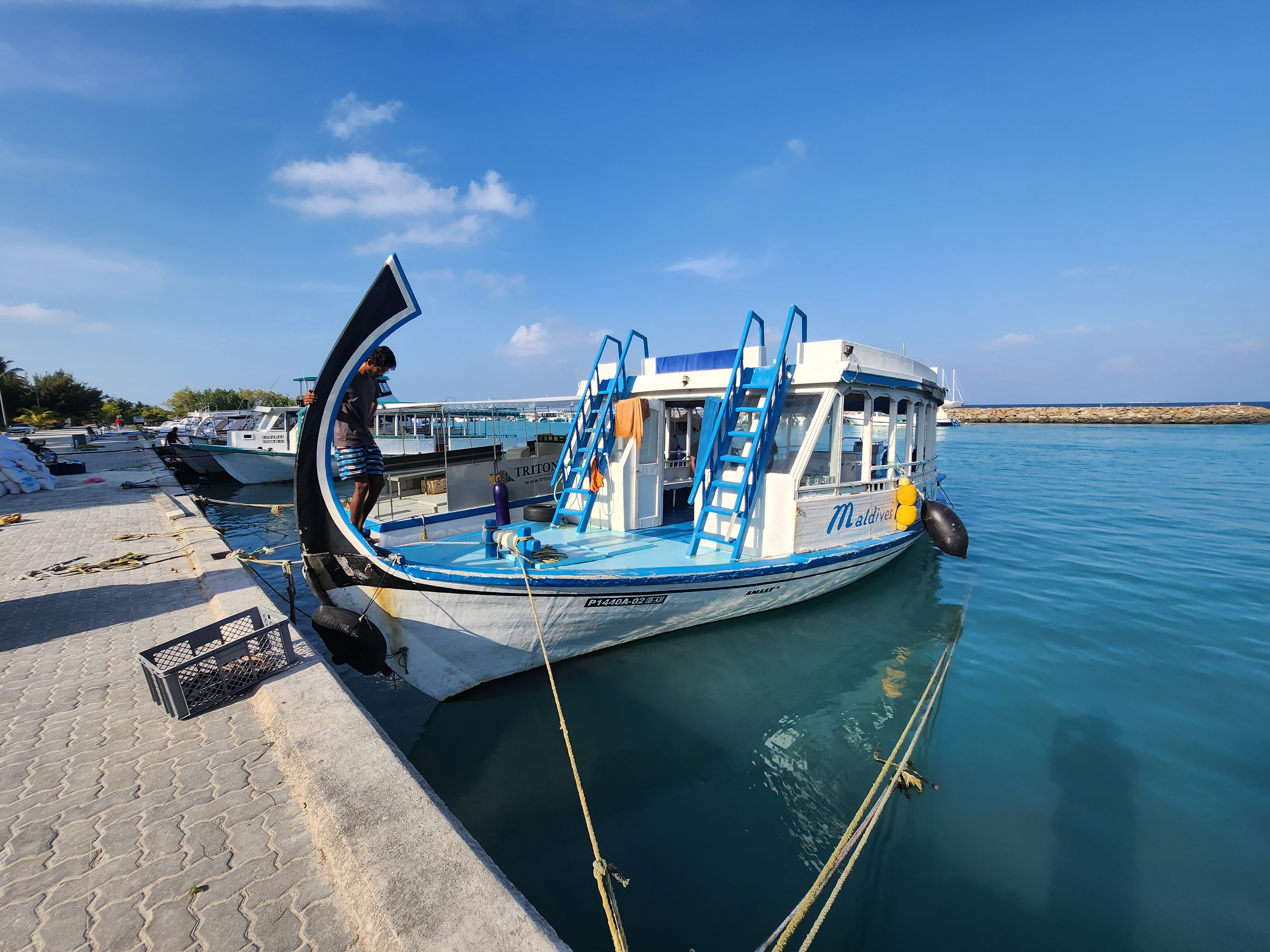
Dive Boat

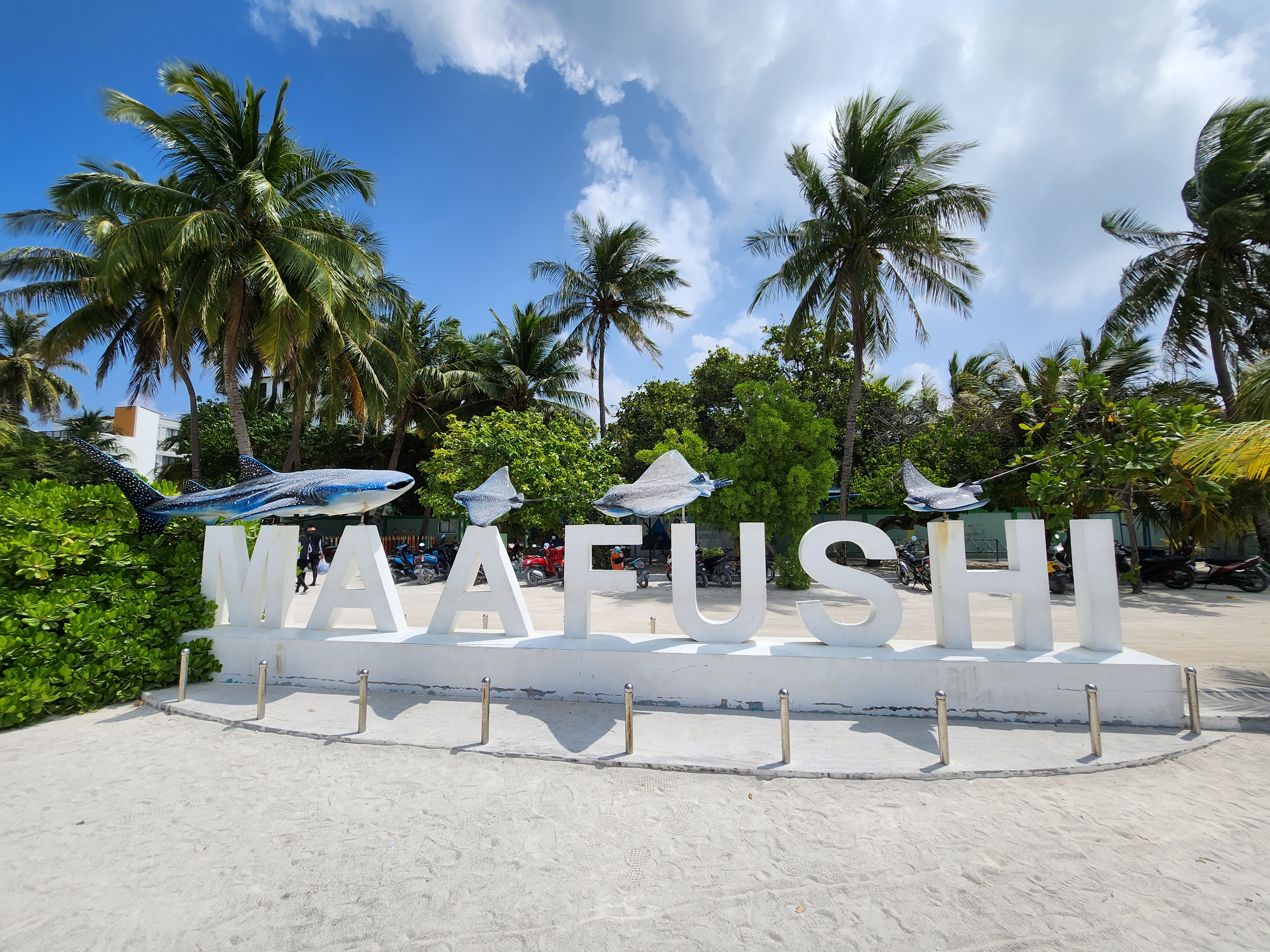
Maafushi Sign

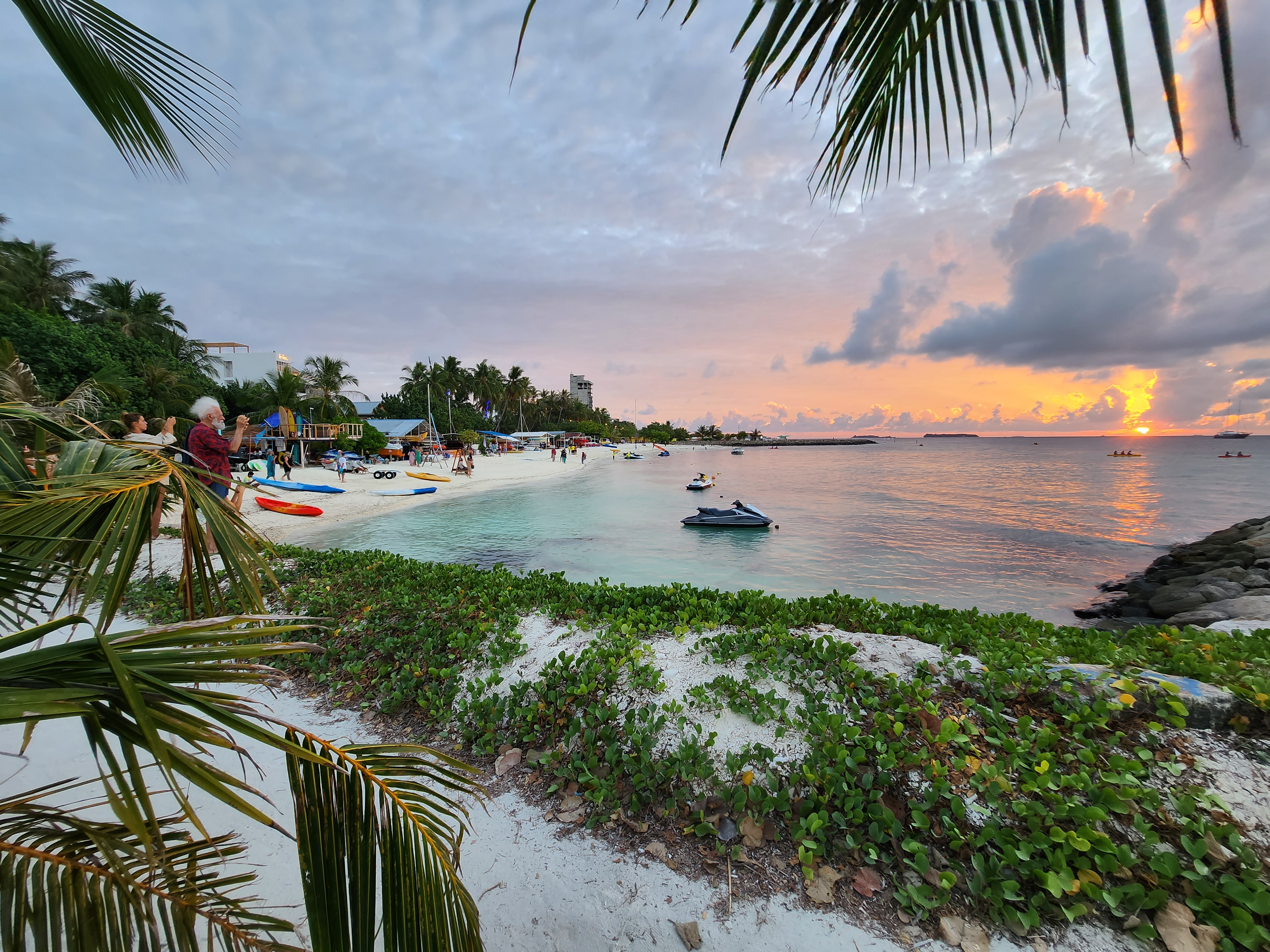
Sunset at Water Sports Beach

== See also ==
- List of islands by population density
