= Maldivian diaspora =

Regions with significant populations
- Sri Lanka: 20,000 (2013)
- India: ~15,000 (Note: 5,000 citizens and 10,000 Mahls.) (2011)
- Malaysia: 3,000 (2008)
- Singapore: 1,000 (2008)
- Pakistan: 500 (2010)
- Australia: 450 (2011)

Languages
- Maldivian

Religion
- Sunni Islam

The Maldivian diaspora refers to the community of Maldivians, speakers of the Maldivian language, who have either emigrated from the Republic of Maldives or grew up outside of the Maldives speaking Dhivehi as a first language. The Republic of Maldives is a South Asian country geographically located in the Indian Ocean, Laccadive Sea and Arabian Sea. Maldivians have historically emigrated from the Maldives for numerous reasons including low economic opportunity, political repression and education. India and Sri Lanka currently host the most Maldivians living outside of the Maldives, but other diaspora communities can be found in Malaysia, Singapore, Pakistan, and Australia.

== Background ==
The Maldivian diaspora can be divided into two major subcategories: Maldivian citizens living abroad and Dhivehi speaking communities with no legal connection to the Maldivian state. The 2014 census found a total of 5,589 Maldivian citizens living abroad. However, there is little information on the exact size of the non-citizen Dhivehi speaking diaspora. While a 2011 UNESCO report found that the majority of Maldivian citizens living outside of the Maldives were sailors operating foreign commercial vessels, Maldivians have also left their country for political, economic, and academic reasons.

== Maldivians in South Asia ==
The majority of Maldivian speakers living abroad can currently be found in India and Sri Lanka. Maldivians in India, the largest community of Maldivians abroad, are predominantly found in the union territory of Lakshadweep that lies off the coast of the Indian mainland. Ethnic Maldivians living in Lakshadweep are concentrated on the island of Minicoy, an Indian territory of the Maldive Islands. These Maldivians are known as the Mahl people. The first Maldivians in Sri Lanka are thought to have migrated to the island nation centuries ago, but many still maintain their cultural ties to the greater Maldivian community.

While the largest Maldivian communities outside of the Maldives can be found in India and Sri Lanka, there are currently numerous Maldivians in Pakistan as well. These Maldivians are largely students who travel to Pakistan to study in madrassas across the country.

== Politics ==
Political repression is one reason many Maldivians have chosen to emigrate. Many journalists have been arrested after expressing anti-government views, and some have disappeared entirely under suspicious circumstances. Journalists have even been sentenced to death for their reporting, at least five of whom were below the age of 18. In 2017, four independent Maldivian journalists living abroad were threatened with arrest for espousing pro-democratic and openly secular viewpoints on their respective blogs. Human rights observers such as Amnesty International have noted that the criminal justice system has been used to silence political opponents as well as the free press.

Mohamed Nasheed, the former president of the Maldives, also found himself living in exile in the United Kingdom after being charged with terrorism in a 2015 trial many outside observers perceived as being politically motivated. After the charges were cleared by the Maldives' Supreme Court in 2018, Nasheed announced that he would run against the previously unopposed President Abdulla Yameen in the upcoming 2018 presidential election. Nasheed's presidential campaign has included numerous trips to Maldivian communities living outside of the Maldives, such as the sizable Maldivian community in Sri Lanka. However, it remains unclear whether the Yameen administration will bow to U.N. pressure and allow Mohamed Nasheed to run as a candidate in the 2018 election.

Maldivians have also left the country in order to fight for various insurgent groups such as the Islamic State. In fact, a 2015 study by The Soufan Group found the Maldives to be the world's greatest supplier per-capita of independent foreign fighters to Iraq and Syria. Many of these insurgent fighters have been known to bring their families with them, either immediately or a few months after becoming established in their new location. Maldivian foreign fighters have become radicalized in both Malé and the Maldives' many smaller island communities. Some have attributed the proportionally high number of radicalized individuals leaving the Maldives to fight in conflicts abroad to the growing strength of the Islamist movement in the country and the Yameen administration's newfound support for its proponents.

== Education ==
A significant percentage of Maldivians living abroad are students pursuing an education at various foreign universities. Maldivian students go abroad for both secular and religious educations and often find themselves studying in universities and madrassas in Malaysia, Australia, the United Kingdom, India, Sri Lanka, and other countries. A 2011 UNESCO report found that approximately 1,200 Maldivian students were studying abroad in 2007. This student diaspora can in large part be attributed to the lack of educational facilities on most of the Maldives' islands. Until recently, the only secondary education provider was located in Malé. Some wealthy Maldivians have also chosen to migrate in order to ensure that their children will have access to superior primary, secondary, and tertiary educational facilities.

== Economy ==
Youth unemployment is a growing social issue in the Maldives. 45% of the population was under 24 years of age as of 2014, and the competition for work among young Maldivians remains severe. A 2010 study found that the unemployment rate in the Maldives was 25% for those between 15 and 24. Youth unemployment has become a major reason for emigration from the Maldives. Maldivians often consider migrating in order to improve their access to financial resources, especially the wealth of job opportunities that exist in foreign countries. In fact, Maldivians’ primary migration-related interests remain jobs. When young Maldivians move abroad for work, older members of their families sometimes join them as migrants in order to continue living alongside their children and grandchildren. This pattern of migration can also be seen in Maldivians moving from the outlying islands to Malé.

Maldivians also choose to move abroad because the cost of living in Malé is higher than most places in Sri Lanka and India. Some also attribute this migration to a lack of housing and overcrowding around the Maldivian capital, a problem which has grown increasingly pressing as Maldivians continue to migrate from the outer islands to the capital.

== Healthcare ==
The government of the Maldives has recently made efforts to deepen its relationship with Maldivians living abroad. In 2013, the government expanded the Maldives' universal health insurance, Aasandha, to Maldivians living abroad in Sri Lanka and India provided they visit a select few "empanelled" hospitals. This expansion of health insurance to Maldivians living abroad has come under criticism given the poor state of the Maldivian healthcare system and the difficulty many Maldivians currently face finding adequate healthcare services in their home country.

== Climate ==
The Maldives has, in recent years, become one of the epicenters of the climate refugee debate. The Maldives has an average estimated elevation of 1.5 meters above sea-level, with 80 percent of its islands currently resting less than 1 meter above sea-level. The total landmass of the islands is continuously decreasing due to rising sea-levels, and many of the smaller islands are thought to be years away from becoming completely submerged. Climate change has recently become a long-term security issue for the Maldives which, according to numerous climate scientists, could disappear entirely within one or two centuries.

Rising ocean temperatures are also a major environmental challenge facing the Maldives. Rising sea surface temperatures cause significant damage to coral reefs, which serve as natural breakwaters. The death of the coral reefs surrounding the Maldives could lead to the loss of the natural protection those reefs provide from waves and currents, in turn increasing the likelihood of beach erosion. The rise in sea surface temperatures also leads to coral bleaching. A significant increase in the water temperature causes coral to expel the zooxanthellae which live in the tissue of the coral, making the coral turn white in color. Since the devastating El Niño of 1998, marine biologists in the Maldives have been particularly concerned about the impact on the local marine environment. Since 2015 was the warmest year on record, by September 2015, many coral reefs in the Maldives had become severely bleached. The rapid degradation of the coral reefs around the Maldives could negatively influences the country's tourism industry, which currently makes up 34% of the Maldives's GDP. Fishing, the country's second largest industry, could also be affected by climate change. Fish might migrate to other ocean areas if the sea temperatures around the Maldives continue to increase, which could lead to a decrease in the country's GDP as high as 7%.

Several kinds of natural disasters affect the Maldives, including tsunamis, cyclones, earthquakes, thunderstorms, and flash floods caused by heavy rains and swell waves. The threats posed by many of these environmental hazards have been amplified by climate changes in recent decades. Rainfall has been erratic and drought patterns have changed, causing prolonged dry seasons and unusual monsoon patterns. This directly affects the Maldives’ agriculture, causing the already limited farmland to shrink continuously. As a consequence, the country has had to depend on imported goods for a steadily increasing percentage of its food supply. For the same reason, communities have had to manage increasingly saline groundwater. The majority of islands in the Maldives do not have a secure supply of fresh water or distribution networks that can ensure sufficient safe freshwater during dry periods. It is also due to these prolonged dry periods that many islands have experienced severe shortages of drinking water, often necessitating emergency water supply initiatives on the part of the government. Freshwater security is currently a pressing issue in the Maldives.

Many climate related diseases, such as dengue and scrub typhus, have also become more common. The incidence of these vector-borne diseases in the Maldives are expected to steadily increase over the next few decades. In December 2006, the country had its first outbreak of Chikungunya, another climate related vector-borne disease.

While many Maldivians are expected to become either climate refugees or internally displaced due to rising sea levels, the 1951 United Nations Convention on the Status of Refugees does not recognize climate change as a valid reason for refugee status. While the ongoing environmental changes have affected housing, freshwater access, food production, and fisheries, Maldivians are currently more likely to consider leaving their homeland in order to improve their financial education or to receive a tertiary education. In fact, migration is only one of the strategies being considered by the government of the Maldives for dealing with the threat posed by climate change.

== Government response ==
In 2008, the government of Mohamed Nasheed began to spend a portion of its annual tourist revenue on the search for a new homeland. Nasheed argued that "We can do nothing to stop climate change on our own and so we have to buy land elsewhere. It's an insurance policy for the worst possible outcome. After all, the Israelis [began by buying] land in Palestine." Before his ouster in 2012, Nasheed launched numerous initiatives and publicity stunts in order to raise global awareness about the threat posed by rising sea levels to the Maldives. One of the most famous of which was an underwater cabinet meeting in which he and his cabinet donned scuba gear in order to discuss state environmental policies at the bottom of the Indian Ocean in 2009. In 2012, the Nasheed administration set aside a sovereign savings account with which to buy land in Australia in preparation for the eventual evacuation of the citizens of the Maldives from their country. However, the Nasheed administration also considered moving the country's population to India or Sri Lanka as well.

After Nasheed's close defeat in the contested elections that proceeded his ouster, he was replaced by Abdulla Yameen. The Yameen administration has been less concerned with the environmental threat to the Maldives and reemphasized the need to focus on development and foreign investment. This move has been criticized by Nasheed and his supporters as politically motivated and a Chinese bid for influence over the islands. However, the Yameen administration has touted Chinese investment as a critical factor in the land restoration projects being pursued by his administration in order to preserve the islands. Numerous policy analysts have pointed to the conflict between proponents of land restoration and proponents of relocation in the Maldives as part of the greater struggle between China and India for influence in South Asia.

Both the Maldivian government and a number of external research agencies have considered numerous methods for adapting to and overcoming the environmental problems currently facing the Maldives. Their proposals include sea walls, land reclamation, expansion of beach vegetation, population relocation, flood warning systems, and large-scale island expansion and reconstruction. The Maldivian government has put some of these suggestions into practice, but there are still major uncertainties regarding future climate change and its impact. While the current policies of the Yameen administration indicate that the mass migration of the Maldives' residents to Australia or Sri Lanka is no longer the government's primary strategy for dealing with rising sea levels, it remains to be seen how future administrations will deal with this problem.

== International assistance ==
International organizations such as the World Bank have provided assistance to the Maldives in order to help it mitigate the environmental and socio-economic problems which have led to emigration from the country. This assistance has taken the form of improving the economic opportunities available to the local population both in the island nation's traditional economic areas such as tourism and fishing as well as entirely new industries. Such assistance has also strengthened the Maldives' capacity for natural resource management and climate resilience, as well as enhanced its ability to manage its public finances efficiently. The World Bank Group also provides consultation in policy-making.

The Maldives also regularly receives economic aid from countries such as Japan, Saudi Arabia, and Australia. Between 1987 and 2002, Japan helped construct six kilometers of coastal protection works around the city of Malé in order to protect the capital from major storms, tsunamis, and the constant threat of sea level rise. After the completion of these coastal barriers, Japan has continued to be a major supplier of economic aid and other forms of non-monetary assistance to the Maldives.

== Criticism of the term "climate migrants" ==
Phrases such as "climate refugees" and "climate migrants" have come under an increasing amount of scrutiny by various political analysts and researchers. Some analysts, such as Robert Stojanov and Ilan Kelman, have suggested the Maldivian government should, instead of simply responding to climate change in a vacuum, place climate change within wider development contexts, such as employment, education, health care, public services and the livelihoods of Maldivian citizens. They argue that climate change must always be considered in relation to other social and environmental issues, especially considering the fact that climate change is currently far from the dominant reason behind emigration from the Maldives. These critics believe that a more nuanced analysis of Maldivian social and environmental conditions would allow the government to make migration-related policies based on more than assumptions about climate change.
