= Christianity in the Maldives =

Christianity is a minority religion in the Maldives. An estimated 0.3 or 0.4% of the population is Christian.

== Demographics ==
Felix Wilfred notes that the number of Christians in Maldives as 1,400 or 0.4% of the country's population. According to ARDA, 0.3% of the population is Christian as of 2020 (roughly split between Catholic and Protestant). Christians are mainly composed of foreign workers; it is believed that the number of native Maldivian Christians is very low.

== Overview ==
The Maldives is among the countries with the least tolerance towards Christians. Citizens of the Maldives who attempt to convert to Christianity automatically lose their citizenship; public practice of the Christian religion is prohibited. Foreign workers are allowed to practice their religion but only in private.

In the late 1990s, the Supreme Council for Islamic Affairs warned people that they would face arrest if they listened to radio programmes broadcast in the Dhivehi language by the Far East Broadcasting Association, based in the Seychelles. In 1998, 50 Maldivian Christians were arrested and held on the prison island of Dhoonidhoo, and Christian foreigners who were suspected of missionary work were also expelled from the country.

The Church of South India, the Evangelical Mennonite Church and the Seventh-day Adventists are present in this country. Roman Catholics in the Maldives are covered by the Archdiocese of Colombo. The Annals of the Propagation of the Faith mentions that in 1833 after the consecration of Clément Bonnand as the Vicar Apostolic of Pondicherry, he was authorized by the Holy See to send missionaries to the Maldive Islands where the Christian faith has not reached.

President Maumoon Abdul Gayoom stated that the Maldives would be deprived of independence if it is not entirely Muslim. The Maldivian High Commission in Colombo stated in 1998, that reports of persecution are inaccurate and wrong.

According to Open Doors, the country was rated as the 15th worst place in the world to be a Christian.

== History ==
The arrival of the Portuguese saw the first appearance of Christianity in the region. In 1558 the Portuguese established a small garrison with a Viador (Viyazoru), or overseer of a factory (trading post) in the Maldives, which they administered from their main colony in Goa. After conquering the capital of Malé, the Portuguese installed Andiri Andiri (or Dom Manoel) as ruler, a Christian of Maldivian and Portuguese parentage. They tried to forcefully impose Christianity on the locals under threat of death, and some of the nobility were converted. Many Islamic scholars were killed by the Portuguese After Muhammad Bodu Thakurufaanu and his army repelled the Portuguese in 1573, Christianity receded.

The Dutch nominally controlled the region in the mid-17th century then the British in the last years of the 17th century. However, the Dutch and British did not interfere with the religious beliefs of the locals. In the 21st century, Christianity in the Maldives is mainly practiced by tourists and temporary workers.

== See also ==
- Roman Catholicism in the Maldives
- Filipinos in the Maldives

== Online sources ==
- opendoorsusa.org
- aaa.net.au
- persecution.net
- UN
