= Demographics of the Maldives =

Demographics of Maldives
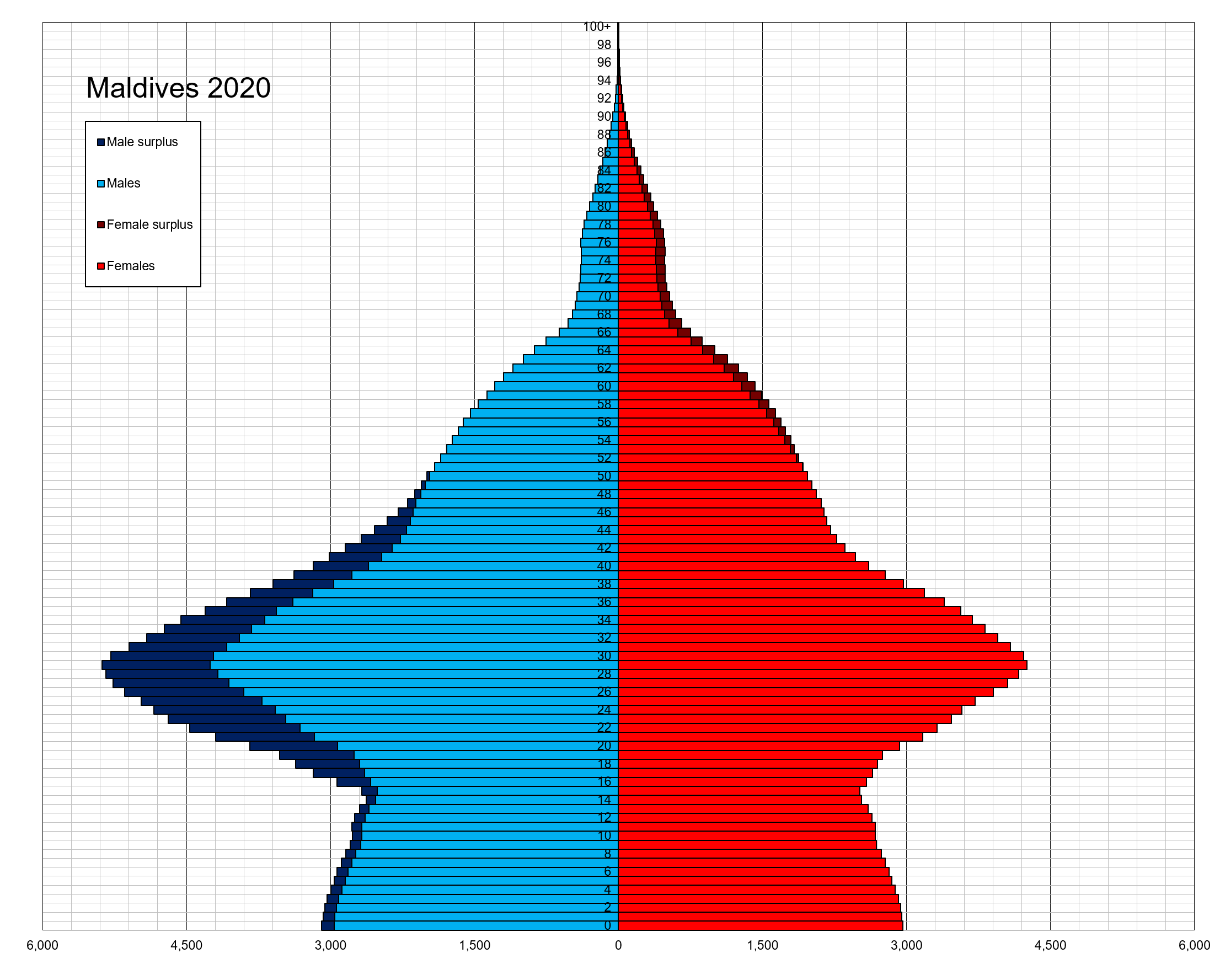
- Population pyramid of the Maldives in 2020
- Population: 515,122 (2022)
- Growth rate: -0.14% (2022)
- Birth rate: 9.7 births/1,000 population (2025 est.)
- Death rate: 2.4 deaths/1,000 population (2025 est.)
- Life expectancy: 76.94 years
  - male: 74.57 years
  - female: 79.42 years
- Fertility rate: 1.71 children born/woman (2022 est.)
- Infant mortality: 25.7 deaths/1,000 live births
- Net migration rate: -12.78 migrant(s)/1,000 population (2022 est.)
- Immigrant share: 14.2% (2024)

Age structure
- 0–14 years: 19.72%
- 15–64 years: 76.94%
- 65 and over: 3.34%

Nationality
- Nationality: Maldivian

Census population and growth rate
Year	Pop.	±% p.a.
1911	72,237	—
1921	70,413	−0.26%
1931	79,281	+1.19%
1946	82,068	+0.23%
1953	77,273	−0.86%
1957	83,075	+1.83%
1962	92,744	+2.23%
1967	103,801	+2.28%
1972	122,673	+3.40%
1977	142,832	+3.09%
1985	180,088	+2.94%
1990	213,215	+3.43%
1995	244,814	+2.80%
2000	270,101	+1.99%
2006	298,968	+1.71%
2014	344,023	+1.77%
2022	382,639	+1.34%

This is a demography of the population of Maldives, including population density, ethnicity, education level, health of the populace, economic status, religious affiliations and other aspects of the population.

== Population size and structure ==
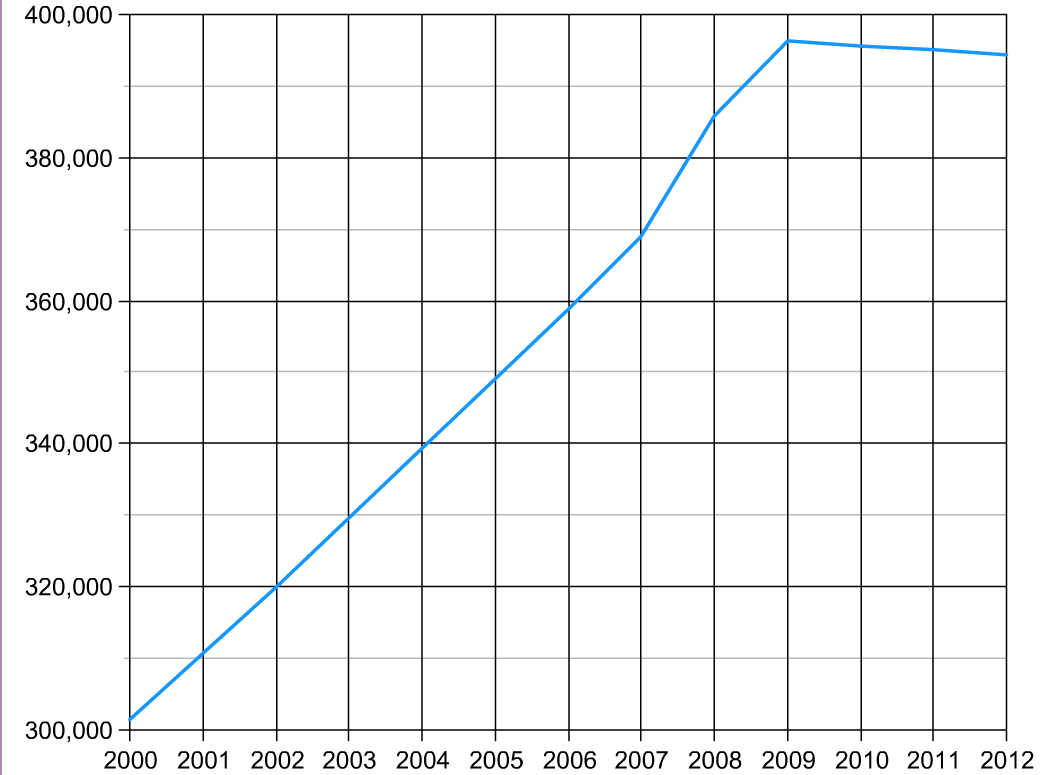
Demographics of the Maldives, from 2000 to 2012

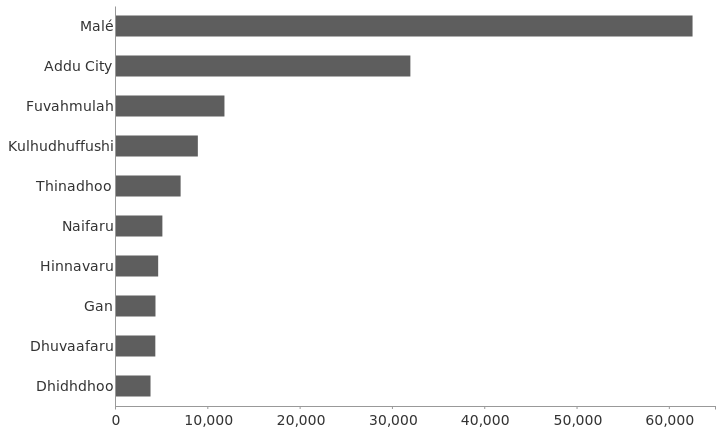
Population by locality (2012)

=== Structure of the population ===
Population by Sex and Age Group (Census 21.III.2006) (Total population is taken as de facto and de jure together.):

Age group	Male	Female	Total	%
Total	151 459	147 509	298 968	100
0–4	13 362	12 809	26 171	8.75
5–9	15 352	14 515	29 867	9.99
10–14	19 111	17 888	36 999	12.38
15–19	20 155	19 749	39 904	13.35
20–24	16 933	17 876	34 809	11.64
25–29	11 915	12 666	24 581	8.22
30–34	10 022	10 613	20 635	6.90
35–39	8 780	9 394	18 174	6.08
40–44	7 828	8 043	15 871	5.31
45–49	6 872	6 697	13 569	4.54
50–54	4 147	3 789	7 936	2.65
55–59	3 046	2 813	5 859	1.96
60–64	2 852	2 714	5 566	1.86
65–69	3 014	2 664	5 678	1.90
70–74	2 333	1 853	4 186	1.40
75–79	1 444	933	2 377	0.80
80–84	617	447	1 064	0.36
85–89	241	155	396	0.13
90–94	89	70	159	0.05
95+	52	32	84	0.03
unknown	3 294	1 789	5 083	1.70
Age group	Male	Female	Total	Percent
0–14	47 825	45 212	93 037	31.12
15–64	92 550	94 354	186 904	62.52
65+	7 790	6 154	13 944	4.66

Population Estimates by Sex and Age Group (01.VII.2013) :

Age group	Male	Female	Total	%
Total	169 800	166 424	336 224	100
0–4	16 714	16 429	33 143	9.86
5–9	13 826	13 318	27 144	8.07
10–14	14 498	13 671	28 169	8.38
15–19	18 153	16 795	34 948	10.39
20–24	20 743	19 640	40 383	12.01
25–29	19 091	19 401	38 492	11.45
30–34	14 054	14 828	28 882	8.59
35–39	10 761	11 263	22 024	6.55
40–44	9 409	9 935	19 344	5.75
45–49	8 270	8 587	16 857	5.01
50–54	7 421	7 340	14 761	4.39
55–59	5 105	4 799	9 904	2.95
60–64	3 118	2 884	6 002	1.79
65–69	2 542	2 495	5 037	1.50
70–74	2 430	2 338	4 768	1.42
75–79	1 971	1 648	3 619	1.08
80+	1 693	1 054	2 747	0.82
Age group	Male	Female	Total	Percent
0–14	45 038	43 418	88 456	26.31
15–64	116 126	115 471	231 597	68.88
65+	8 636	7 535	16 171	4.81

Population Estimates by Sex and Age Group (01.VII.2020) (Based on the results of the 2014 Population Census. Data refer to resident population which includes resident Maldivians and resident foreigners.):

Age group	Male	Female	Total	%
Total	356 149	201 277	557 426	100
0–4	20 612	18 798	39 411	7.07
5–9	19 345	17 242	36 587	6.56
10–14	17 446	16 495	33 941	6.09
15–19	17 354	13 032	30 386	5.45
20–24	48 242	16 763	65 005	11.66
25–29	65 935	21 387	87 322	15.67
30–34	51 583	22 366	73 949	13.27
35–39	36 844	19 016	55 859	10.02
40–44	24 838	13 365	38 203	6.85
45–49	17 124	10 950	28 074	5.04
50–54	11 939	9 187	21 126	3.79
55–59	8 754	7 754	16 508	2.96
60–64	6 450	6 008	12 458	2.23
65–69	3 351	2 958	6 309	1.13
70–74	2 232	2 200	4 432	0.80
75–79	1 832	1 848	3 680	0.66
80+	2 269	1 908	4 177	0.75
Age group	Male	Female	Total	Percent
0–14	57 403	52 535	109 938	19.72
15–64	289 062	139 828	428 890	76.94
65+	9 684	8 914	18 598	3.34

== Vital statistics ==
=== UN estimates ===
Period	Live births per year	Deaths per year	Natural change per year	CBR^{1}	CDR^{1}	NC^{1}	TFR^{1}	IMR^{1}
1950–1955	3 000	2 000	1 000	43.2	27.7	15.5	6.03	233.4
1955–1960	4 000	2 000	2 000	53.0	28.2	24.8	6.81	221.6
1960–1965	5 000	3 000	3 000	55.0	27.2	27.9	7.12	205.5
1965–1970	6 000	3 000	3 000	52.2	23.4	28.8	7.22	175.5
1970–1975	6 000	2 000	4 000	47.4	19.3	28.1	7.17	146.5
1975–1980	6 000	2 000	4 000	44.1	15.7	28.3	6.86	121.5
1980–1985	8 000	2 000	6 000	47.8	12.7	35.1	7.26	97.2
1985–1990	9 000	2 000	7 000	45.4	10.5	34.8	6.81	77.1
1990–1995	8 000	2 000	6 000	35.6	8.0	27.6	5.25	62.5
1995–2000	7 000	1 000	5 000	25.1	5.5	19.6	3.52	41.7
2000–2005	6 000	1 000	4 000	19.7	4.1	15.6	2.49	26.5
2005–2010	5 000	1 000	4 000	17.2	3.7	13.5	1.90	9.8
^{1} CBR = crude birth rate (per 1000); CDR = crude death rate (per 1000); NC = natural change (per 1000); TFR = total fertility rate (number of children per woman); IMR = infant mortality rate per 1000 births

=== Registered births and deaths ===
	Average estimated population	Live births	Deaths	Natural change	Crude birth rate (per 1000)	Crude death rate (per 1000)	Natural change (per 1000)	Crude migration change (per 1000)	Total Fertility Rate
1980	157,000	6,822	1,787	5,035	43.6	11.4	32.1		
1981	162,000	7,010	1,963	5,047	43.3	12.1	31.2	-0.30	
1982	168,000	7,402	2,129	5,273	44.1	12.7	31.4	4.49	
1983	174,000	7,236	1,748	5,488	41.6	10.1	31.6	3.05	
1984	180,000	8,255	1,640	6,615	45.8	9.1	36.7	-3.53	
1985	187,000	8,968	1,607	7,361	48.0	8.6	39.4	-2.01	
1986	193,000	8,615	1,511	7,104	44.6	7.8	36.8	-5.90	
1987	200,000	8,364	1,525	6,839	41.8	7.6	34.2	0.83	
1988	207,000	8,297	1,526	6,771	40.2	7.4	32.8	1.15	
1989	213,000	8,726	1,476	7,250	41.0	6.9	34.0	-6.04	
1990	219,000	8,639	1,355	7,284	39.4	6.2	33.2	-6.03	
1991	226,000	8,390	1,366	7,024	37.2	6.1	31.1	-0.11	
1992	232,000	8,139	1,330	6,809	35.1	5.7	29.4	-3.58	
1993	238,000	7,780	1,319	6,461	32.7	5.6	27.2	-1.99	
1994	243,000	7,382	1,240	6,142	30.3	5.1	25.2	-4.80	
1995	249,000	6,849	1,151	5,698	27.5	4.6	22.9	1.24	
1996	254,000	6,772	1,213	5,559	26.7	4.8	21.9	-2.24	
1997	259,000	6,184	1,175	5,009	23.9	4.5	19.3	-0.04	
1998	264,000	5,687	1,121	4,566	21.6	4.2	17.3	1.68	
1999	269,000	5,225	1,037	4,188	19.5	3.9	15.6	3.08	
2000	273,000	5,399	1,032	4,367	19.8	3.8	16.0	-1.36	
2001	278,000	4,897	1,081	3,816	17.6	3.9	13.7	4.34	
2002	282,000	5,003	1,113	3,890	17.7	3.9	13.8	0.40	
2003	287,000	5,157	1,030	4,127	18.0	3.6	14.4	3.10	
2004	291,000	5,220	1,015	4,205	17.9	3.5	14.5	-0.71	
2005	295,000	5,543	1,027	4,516	18.8	3.5	15.3	-1.77	
2006	300,000	5,829	1,083	4,746	19.5	3.6	15.9	0.86	
2007	305,000	6,569	1,118	5,451	21.6	3.7	18.0	-1.50	
2008	310,000	6,946	1,061	5,885	22.6	3.4	19.1	-2.90	
2009	315,000	7,423	1,163	6,260	23.6	3.7	19.9	-4.06	2.400
2010	320,000	7,115	1,105	6,010	22.3	3.5	18.8	-3.21	2.263
2011	325,000	7,180	1,137	6,043	22.1	3.5	18.6	-3.26	2.239
2012	331,000	7,431	1,135	6,296	22.5	3.4	19.0	-0.91	2.259
2013	336,000	7,153	1,120	6,033	21.3	3.3	18.0	-3.12	2.133
2014	437,535	7,245	1,143	6,102	16.6	2.6	14.0	284.03	2.007
2015	454,434	6,896	1,130	5,766	15.2	2.5	12.7	25.44	1.907
2016	472,426	6,756	1,226	5,530	14.3	2.6	11.7	27.42	1.805
2017	491,589	6,723	1,241	5,482	13.7	2.5	11.2	28.96	1.718
2018	512,038	6,586	1,300	5,286	12.9	2.5	10.4	30.85	1.651
2019	533,941	6,153	1,132	5,021	11.5	2.1	9.4	32.97	1.557
2020	557,426	6,293	1,275	5,018	11.3	2.3	9.0	34.59	1.572
2021	568,362	5,914	1,552	4,362	10.4	2.7	7.7	11.79	1.506
2022	547,651	5,755	1,491	4,264	10.5	2.7	7.8		
2023	556,836	5,956	1,517	4,439	10.7	2.7	8.0		
2024		5,840	1,470	4,370	10.2	2.6	7.6		
2025	581,053	5,625	1,399	4,226	9.7	2.4	7.3		

=== Demographic and Health Surveys ===
Fertility Rate (TFR) (Wanted Fertility Rate) and CBR (Crude Birth Rate):

Year	Total		Urban		Rural	
Year	CBR	TFR	CBR	TFR	CBR	TFR
2009	24.7	2.5 (2.2)	22.9	2.1 (1.9)	25.5	2.8 (2.4)
2016–17	22.0	2.1 (1.9)	19.9	1.8 (1.5)	23.0	2.5 (2.2)

=== Total fertility rate ===
The total fertility rate differs greatly from as low as 2.05 children per woman in Malé to a maximum of 3.88 children in Faafu.

Code Name	Official name	Population (2014 census)	Reg. Population (31 December 2018)	TFR (2014 census)
Malé	Malé City	133,412	64,742	2.05
Haa Alif	Thiladhunmathi Uthuruburi	13,004	22,761	2.91
Haa Dhaalu	Thiladhunmathi Dhekunuburi	18,570	27,259	2.91
Shaviyani	Miladhunmadulu Uthuruburi	12,127	18,274	2.66
Noonu	Miladhunmadulu Dhekunuburi	10,556	16,789	2.83
Raa	Maalhosmadulu Uthuruburi	14,934	23,721	2.93
Baa	Maalhosmadulu Dhekunuburi	8,919	14,624	2.45
Lhaviyani	Faadhippolhu	7,996	13,238	2.59
Kaafu	Malé Atholhu	12,232	12,036	2.70
Alif Alif	Ari Atholhu Uthuruburi	5,915	7,614	2.94
Alif Dhaal	Ari Atholhu Dhekunuburi	8,183	11,439	3.30
Vaavu	Felidhu Atholhu	1,622	2,599	2.34
Meemu	Mulak Atholhu	4,711	7,415	2.75
Faafu	Nilandhe Atholhu Uthuruburi	4,140	6,264	3.88
Dhaalu	Nilandhe Atholhu Dhekunuburi	5,329	7,932	2.62
Thaa	Kolhumadulu	8,923	16,161	2.97
Laamu	Haddhunmathi	11,841	16,977	2.67
Gaafu Alif	Huvadhu Atholhu Uthuruburi	8,477	14,057	2.80
Gaafu Dhaalu	Huvadhu Atholhu Dhekunuburi	11,653	21,096	3.13
Gnaviyani	Fuvahmulah City	8,095	13,037	2.76
Addu City	Addu City	19,827	33,876	2.49
Maldives	Republic of Maldives	344,023	374,775	2.46

Years	1925	1926	1927	1928	1929	1930	1931	1932	1933	1934
Total Fertility Rate in Maldives	5.98	5.96	5.95	5.93	5.92	5.90	5.89	5.87	5.86	5.84

Years	1935	1936	1937	1938	1939	1940	1941	1942	1943	1944
Total Fertility Rate in Maldives	5.83	5.81	5.80	5.78	5.76	5.75	5.73	5.72	5.70	5.69

Years	1945	1946	1947	1948	1949
Total Fertility Rate in Maldives	5.67	5.66	5.64	5.63	5.61

=== Life expectancy at birth ===
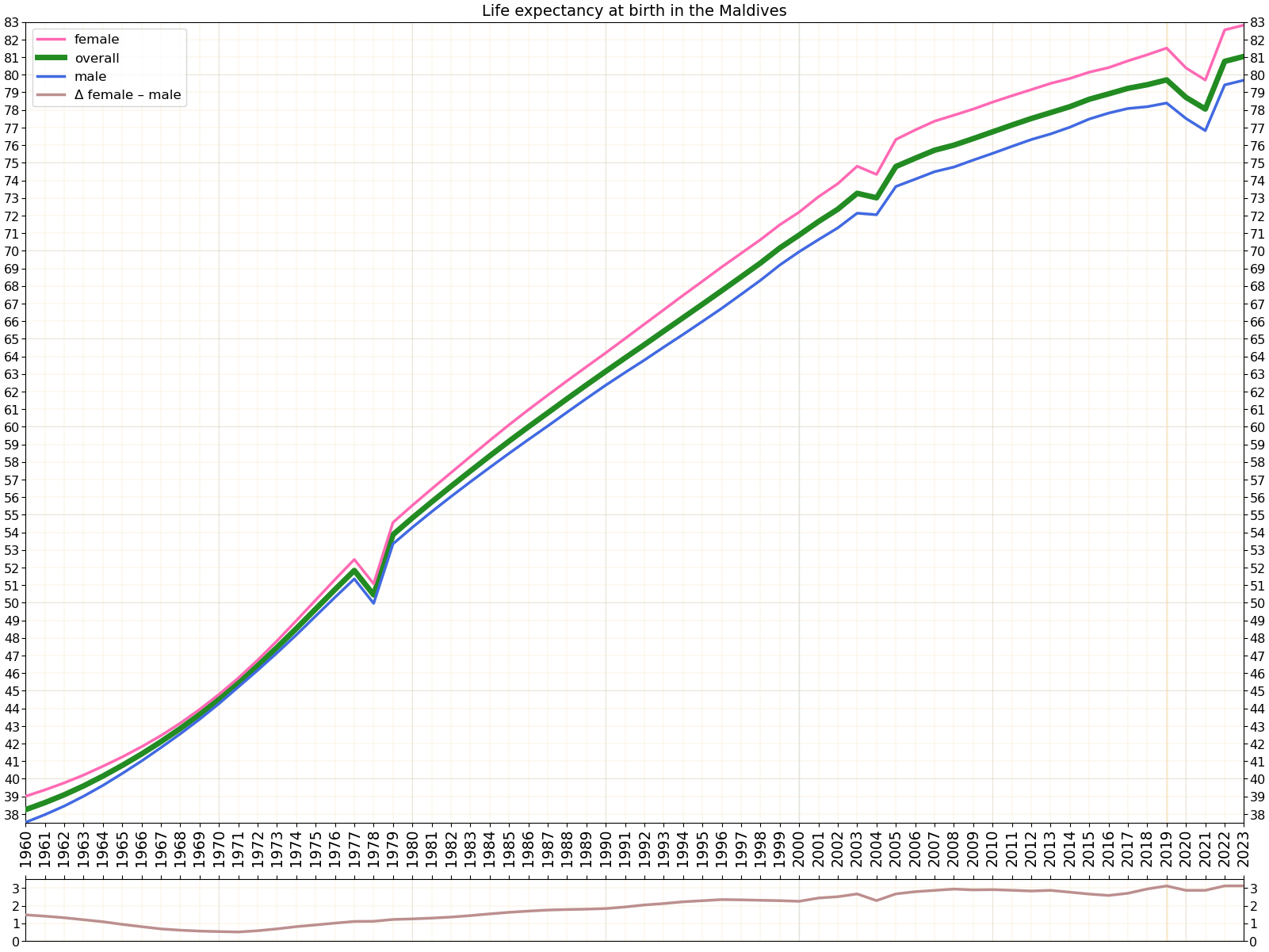
Life expectancy at birth in the Maldives

Period	Life expectancy in Years	Period	Life expectancy in Years
1950–1955	34.5	1985–1990	59.3
1955–1960	36.1	1990–1995	63.5
1960–1965	39.0	1995–2000	67.6
1965–1970	42.4	2000–2005	72.2
1970–1975	46.2	2005–2010	75.6
1975–1980	50.7	2010–2015	76.3
1980–1985	55.5		

Source: UN World Population Prospects

== Ethnic groups ==
The Dhivehin are the largest and effectively the only ethnic group of the Maldives. They are indigenous to the historic region of the Maldive Islands, encompassing the present-day Republic of Maldives and the island of Minicoy in India’s Union Territory of Lakshadweep. The Dhivehin share a common culture and speak the Dhivehi language. They are primarily an Indo-Aryan people, closely related to the Sinhalese, with genetic influences reflecting historical contact with the Middle East, Indian Subcontinent, Austronesia, and Africa.

In the past there was also a small Tamil population known as the Giraavaru people. This group have now been almost completely absorbed into the larger Maldivian society but were once native to the island of Giraavaru (Kaafu Atoll). This island was evacuated in 1968 due to heavy erosion of the island.

Filipinos in the Maldives numbered 3,000 in 2018.

== Languages ==
Dhivehi, an Indo-Aryan language closely related to the Sinhala language of Sri Lanka, and written in a specialized Arabic script (Thaana), is the official language and is spoken by virtually the whole population. English is also spoken as a second language by many.

== Religion ==
Sunni Islam is the state religion. Historically, the Maldives were converted to Islam from Buddhism in the 12th century. Under the 2008 constitution Islam is the official religion of the entire population, as adherence to it is required for citizenship.
