= Maldivians in Pakistan =

- (Maldives) (Pakistan)

Total population
- +- 600 - 800

Regions with significant populations
- Karachi, Islamabad, Lahore and Peshawar.

Languages
- Dhivehi · Urdu

Religion
- Islam

Maldivians in Pakistan are mostly students pursuing degrees and courses across various universities and colleges throughout the country. According to registrations based with the local embassy and Maldivian government records, their numbers are in the hundreds; in addition, some 400-600 students are in the country unregistered. There are an estimated 150 Maldivian students obtaining religious education and instruction in Pakistani Islamic institutions and madrassas. Maldivian diplomats also receive training in Pakistan.

== Safety and security ==
In the afterwake of the 2009 International Islamic University bombing in Islamabad, hundreds of Maldivian students studying in different parts of Pakistan were found fearing for their safety. In November 2009, the Government of Maldives recommended Maldivian students to return amid fears that the war in Pakistan could spread further and pose a danger to the students. In addition, it pledged full cooperation to those who wished to do so.

== Notable people ==
- Ilyas Hussain Ibrahim

== See also ==
- Maldives–Pakistan relations
- Maldivian diaspora
- Immigration to Pakistan
