= National Day (Maldives) =

Public holiday in the Maldives

National Day ޤައުމީ ދުވަސް
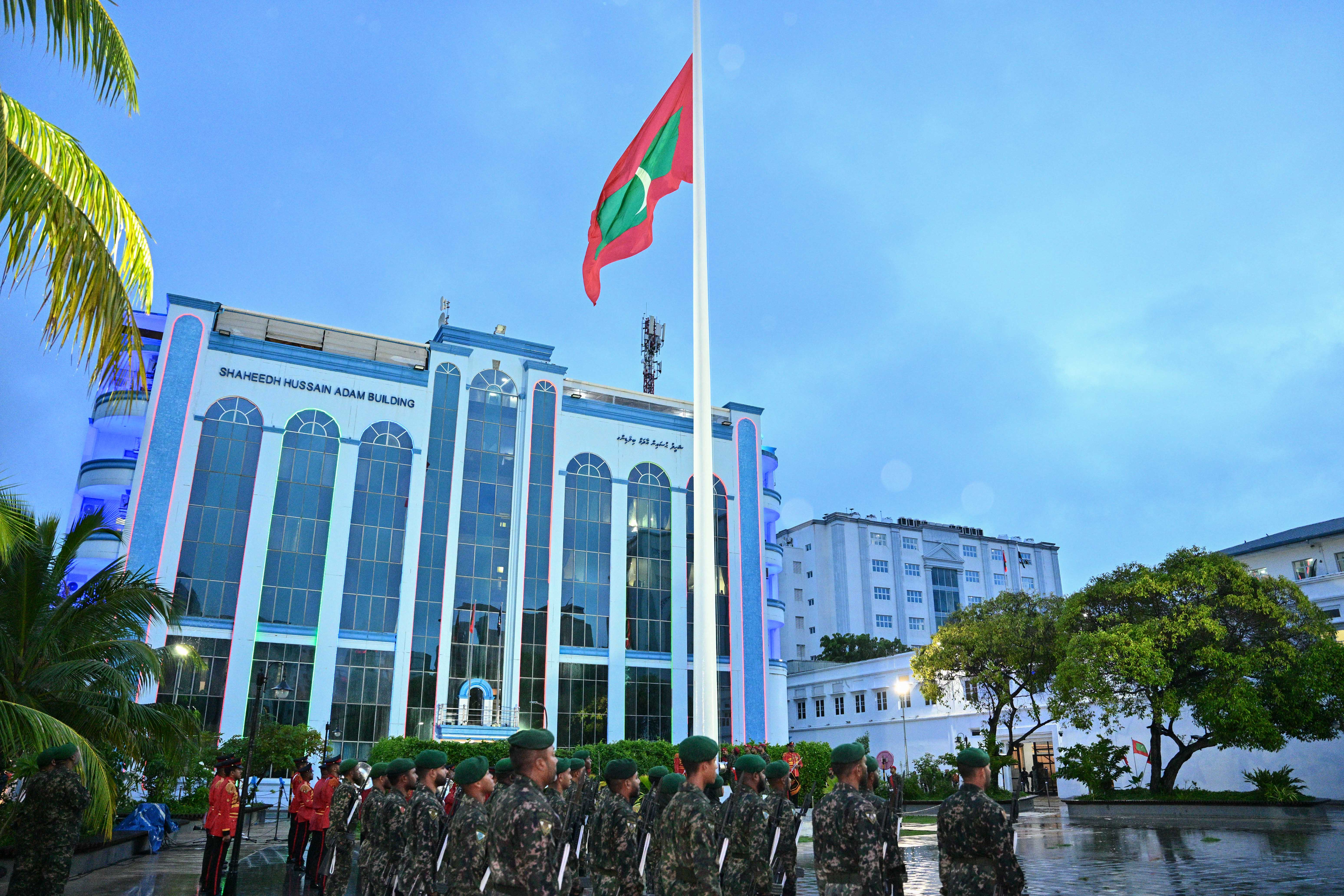
- Flag hoisting at Republic Square in Malé, Maldives held on National Day in the Islamic Year 1448
- Observed by: Maldives
- Type: National
- Celebrations: Flag hoisting, parades, speeches by the president
- Date: 1 Rabi' al-Awwal
- 2026 date: 14 August
- 2027 date: 3 August
- Frequency: Annual
- Related to: Muhammad Thakurufaanu al-Auzam, Maldivian–Portuguese conflicts

The National Day of Maldives (Maldivian: Gaumee dhuvas), is an important day, as it is observed to celebrate the victory of Muhammad Thakurufaanu over the Portuguese occupation in the year 1573. According to the Islamic calendar, the National Day of Maldives falls on the 1st of Rabi' al-Awwal, the third month of Hijri (Islamic) calendar.

== History ==
In the year 1558, Portuguese colonial power invaded the Maldives and established its colonial rule. colonial power attempted to forcefully impose Christianity on the Maldives, on the penalty of death for non-compliance. This was described as:

A time when intolerable enormities were committed by the invading infidels, a time when the sea grew red with Maldivian blood, a time when people were sunk in despair

In 1573, Muhammad Thakurufaanu and his brothers, Ali and Hasan, landed on a different island every night to fight the Portuguese, and then set sail into the ocean before daybreak. They reached the capital island Malé on the night before the day fixed by the Portuguese garrison for the forcible conversion of the inhabitants to Christianity. The brothers along with other Maldivians took the Portuguese by surprise, killing Captain Andreas Andre in an ambush. By dawn, the Portuguese stronghold had fallen, ending the fifteen-year colonial rule.

== Holiday events ==
Since then, 1st of Rabee ul Awwal each Islamic year is marked as a National Day of the Republic of Maldives. Celebrations of the day include parades, color festivals and route marches on the streets of Malé, and in islands.

== See also ==
- Muhammad Thakurufaanu Al Auzam
- Sultanate of the Maldive Islands
- Maldivian–Portuguese conflicts
