= Catholic Church in the Maldives =

The Catholic Church in the Maldives is part of the worldwide Catholic Church, under the spiritual leadership of the Pope in Rome. The annals of the Propaganda mention that in 1833 after the consecration of Clément Bonnand as the Vicar Apostolic of Pondicherry, he was authorized by the Holy See to send missionaries to the Maldives, where the Christian faith had not reached.

There has never, however, been any Catholic territorial jurisdiction in the Maldives; its territory has been the responsibility of the Archdiocese of Colombo in Sri Lanka since 1886. The constitution of the country does not allow citizenship to non-Muslims, and those found with non-Islamic religious materials are subject to arrest.

Figures in 2020 showed that the country is 0.29% Christian; just over half of these are Catholic. In 2024, the country was noted as the 18th worst place in the world to be a Christian.

== History ==
The arrival of the Portuguese also saw the appearance of Christianity in the region. In 1558 the Portuguese established a small garrison with a Viador (Viyazoru), or overseer of a factory (trading post) in the Maldives, which they administered from their main colony in Goa. The missionaries are said to have attempted to impose Christianity on the locals and some of the nobility were converted.

15 years later, a local leader named Muhammad Thakurufaanu al-A'uẓam and his two brothers organized a popular revolt and drove the Portuguese out of Maldives and Roman Catholicism as a consequence receded.

== See also ==
- Christianity in the Maldives
