= Maldivians in India =

Total population
- 5,000

Regions with significant populations
- South India, Thiruvananthapuram, Hyderabad, Bengaluru, Chennai

Languages
- Dhivehi, Malayalam

Religion
- Sunni Islam

There are over 5,000 Maldivian expatriates from the Maldives who live in India. It is one the largest populations of the Maldivian diaspora. They mostly travel to the nearest Indian city and capital of Kerala, Thiruvananthapuram, for educational and health facilities.

== Maldivian students ==
A large number of Maldivian students study in Trivandrum, Mysuru and Bengaluru.

== Mahl people ==
Most Mahls live in their native land of Maliku (Minicoy) in the union territory of Lakshadweep, India. In Lakshadweep the Mahls emerged as a separate ethnic group and are 15.67% of the total population of Lakshadweep. There are migrant communities of Mahls in other parts of India too. The origin of all the Mahl communities in India and elsewhere lies in the island of Minicoy. A number of Mahls have settled in the districts of Kozhikode, Malappuram, Ernakulam and Thiruvananthapuram (Trivandrum) in the southern state of Kerala. There is a community of Mahls in Kerala who came and settled there in the 17th century, when the islands of Lakshadweep came under the rule of Ali Rajahs/Arakkal Bheevi of Kannur.

== See also ==
- Mahl people, ethnic Maldivians of Lakshadweep, India
- Indians in Maldives
- India–Maldives relations
