= Ilyas Hussain Ibrahim =

Maldivian politician

Sheikh Ilyas Hussain Ibrahim
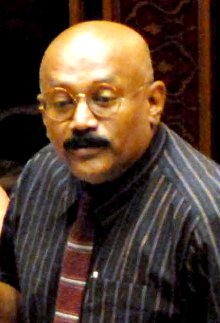

Controller of Immigration & Emigration (Deputy Minister Level)
- In office 13 November 2008 – 22 February 2011
- Preceded by: K. D. Ahmed Maniku
- Succeeded by: Abdulla Shahid

Minister of State for Housing and Environment
- In office 2011–2012

Minister of State, Controller of Immigration & Emigration
- In office 8 February 2012 – 24 May 2012
- Preceded by: Abdulla Shahid
- Succeeded by: Dr. Mohamed Ali

Minister of State for Defense and National Security
- In office 24 May 2012 – 2013

Personal details
- Born: 5 May 1957 (age 68) Kaafu Atoll, Maldives
- Spouse: Rocksana Shava Ruku
- Children: Thanha and Ramha
- Occupation: Writer, politician
- Website: www.ilyashussain.com/articles/

Ilyas Hussain Ibrahim (Dhivehi: އައްޝައިހް އިލިޔާސް ޙުސައިން އިބްރާހީމް, born 5 May 1957) is a Maldivian politician. He was an official in the Ministry of Atolls Development from 1990 to 2004, then a member of the Special Majilis (parliament) representing A.DH Atoll from 2004 to 2008. Between 2008 and 2013 he was Deputy Minister or Minister of State for Immigration and Emigration, Housing and Environment, and then Defense and National Security.

== Early life (1957–90) ==
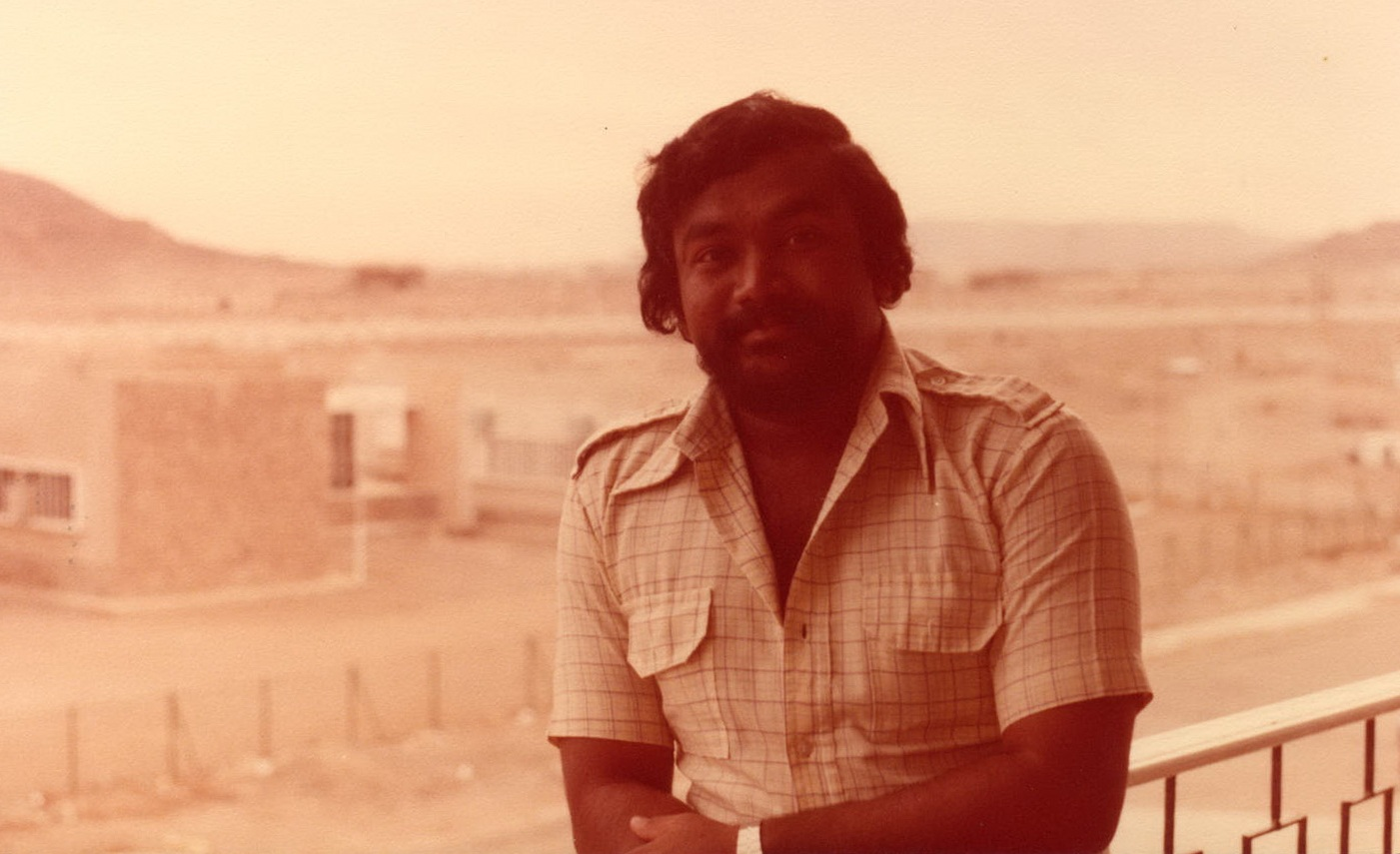
In Medina University in 1979.

According to his website, Ilyas Hussain Ibrahim was born on 5 May 1957 in Kaafu Atoll, Maldives. His father, Hussain Ibrahim Fulhu, was an official at the Central Bank of Maldives. Ilyas Hussain Ibrahim says he studied in Pakistan for three years, in Saudi Arabia for ten years and in the United States for one year. He edited Maldivian student magazines in Pakistan and Saudi Arabia. From 1974 to 1991 he coordinated the Athama Hajj Group, organising and accompanying Hajj visits to Mecca for Maldivian pilgrims. He attended the Islamic University of Madinah in Medina, Saudi Arabia, and obtained a BA in 1983 and a higher diploma in 1984. He is married and has two daughters. Ilyas's website states that from 1984 to 1990 he worked at the Islamic Centre in Malé. From 1986 to 1990 he owned and edited the Manthiri monthly magazine.

== Early political career (1990–2008) ==
From 1990 to 1993 Ilyas was Assistant Under Secretary at the Ministry of Atoll Development. From 1998 to 2004 he was Deputy Director at the Ministry of Atolls Development. Ilyas Hussain, along with two friends Abdulla Saeed (Kottey) and Mohamed Nasheed (Anni), began registering a political party in 2001. Forty-two people signed and forwarded a proposal to the government to form the Maldives Democratic Party or MDP.

From 2004 to 2008 Ilyas Hussain was a member of the Special Majlis (Parliament) as representative for Alif Dhaal Atoll. Ilyas was a founding member of Gaumee Itthihaad (the National Unity Party) in 2008. Gaumee Itthihaad was headed by Mohammed Waheed Hassan, the 5th President of the Maldives from 7 February 2012 to 17 November 2013. In early October 2008 Gaumee Itthihaad formed a coalition with the Maldivian Democratic Party. The MDP Itthihaad fielded Mohamed Nasheed (leader of MDP) as presidential candidate and Dr. Waheed as vice-presidential candidate in the October 2008 presidential election. This was the first democratic election in the history of the country and ended the 30-year reign of President Maumoon Abdul Gayoom.

== Ministry positions (2008–13) ==
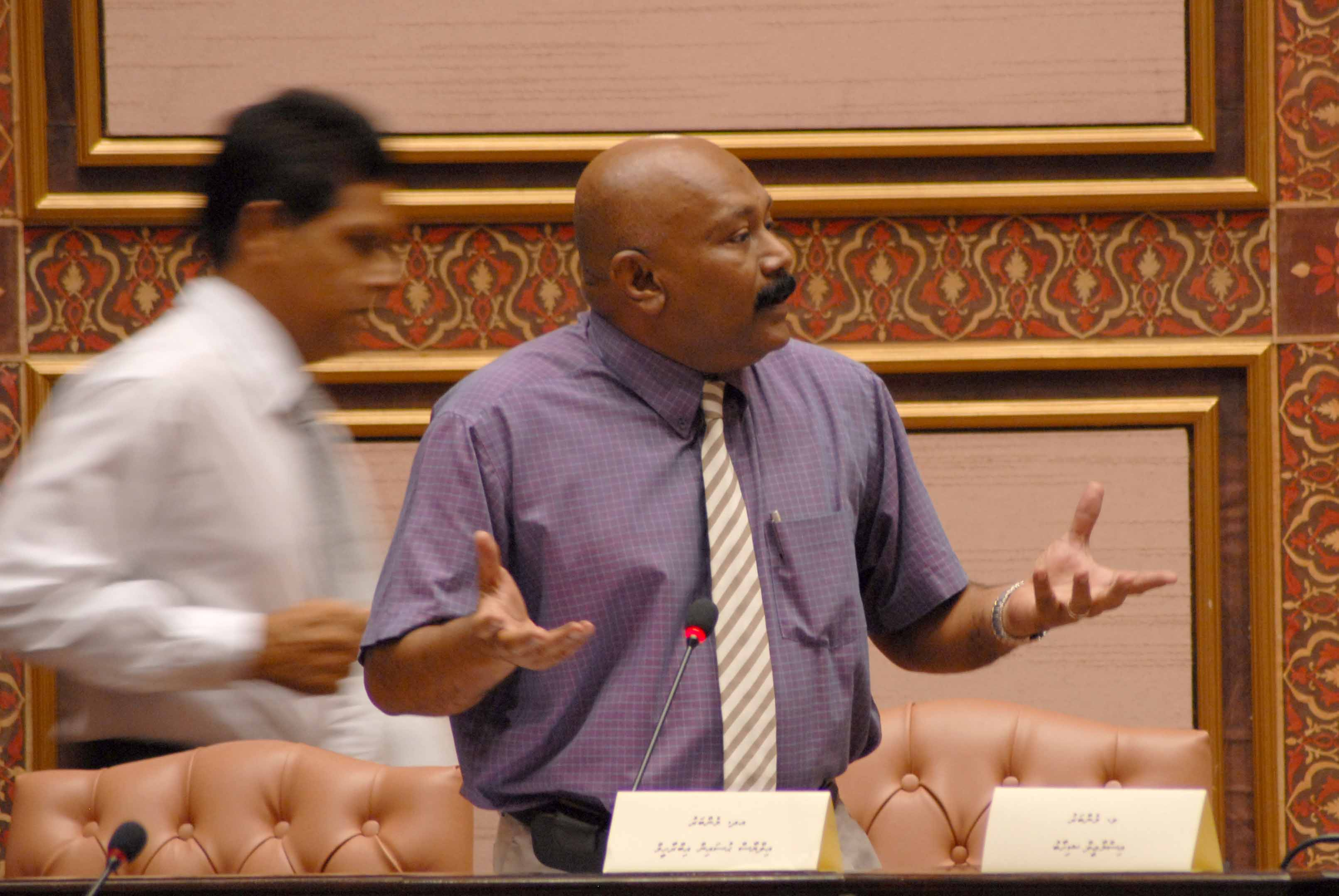
Representing DH atoll

Ilyas Hussain Ibrahim was appointed Controller of Immigration & Emigration (Deputy Minister Level) on 13 November 2008, succeeding K. D. Ahmed Maniku. He held office until 22 February 2011, when he was replaced by Abdulla Shahid. In January 2011 Ilyas expressed concern over the growing number of expatriates in the Maldives working illegally. There were about 80,000 expatriates in the Maldives, out of a total population of almost 350,000, of whom at least 30,000 were illegal. Ilyas noted problems that included loss of visa revenue, drain of money abroad, crime and religious extremism.

On 21 February 2011 President Mohamed Nasheed appointed Ilyas Hussain Ibrahim as Minister of State for Housing and Environment. He exchanged places with Abdulla Shahid, who became Minister of State, Controller of Immigration and Emigration. From 2011 to 2012 he was Minister of State for Housing and Environment. In July 2011, as Chief Coordinator of the National Disaster Management Centre he spoke to the United Nations Special Rapporteur on the Human Rights of internally displaced persons, Chaloka Beyani. Benyani was examining issues related to people displaced by the 2004 tsunami.

Ilyas was appointed Minister of State, Controller of Immigration & Emigration on 8 February 2012, replacing Abdulla Shahid. He held office until 24 May 2012, when he was replaced by Dr. Mohamed Ali. On 24 May 2012 President Mohammed Waheed Hassan appointed Ilyas Hussain Ibrahim as Minister of State for Defence and National Security. He held office until 2013. From 2012 to 2013 he was a board director of the Housing Development Corporation in Malé.

== Later career (from 2013) ==
There were allegations of corruption in the award of the contract for the border control system (BCS) project to Nexbis Limited of Malaysia while Ilyas Hussain Ibrahim was Controller of Immigration. Parliament decided to halt the project. In February 2013 President Waheed said he had no part in the award, which had been made during the government of former president Mohamed Nasheed. He noted that the cabinet had discussed the matter twice, and it had been awarded through a tender process. Ilyas is the brother-in-law of President Waheed. It was rumoured that this relationship had caused the president to avoid comment. On 27 February 2013 it was reported that Ilyas and Sami Ageel, a former director of the Finance ministry, had been charged with corruption related to the BCS project award. At a court hearing in April 2013 Ilyas denied the charges, which he said had no legal basis.

On 25 December 2013 it was reported that former president Mohamed Waheed had decided to join the ruling Progressive Party of Maldives (PPM) after the Gaumee Ihthihaad Party had been dissolved. Ilyas Hussain Ibrahim was among the other leading GIP politicians who also said they were moving to the PPM.
