= Bihuroazu Kamanaa Mosque =

Mosque in Malé, Kaafu, Maldives

- Dhivehi: ބިހުރޯޒު ކަމަނާ މިސްކިތް
- Location within Maldives

Religion
- Affiliation: Sunni Islam
- Sect: Sufism
- Ecclesiastical or organizational status: Mosque
- Status: Active

Location
- Location: Malé, Kaafu Atoll
- Country: Maldives
- Interactive map of Bihuroazu Kamanaa Mosque
- Coordinates: 4°10′33.35″N 73°30′38.20″E

Architecture
- Type: Mosque architecture
- Style: Traditional Maldivian architecture
- General contractor: Bihuroazu Fashan akalo
- Completed: c. 16th century CE

The Bihuroazu Kamanaa Mosque (Dhivehi: ބިހުރޯޒު ކަމަނާ މިސްކިތް), also known as the Bihuroazu Kamanaa Miskiy (Dhivehi: ބޮޑުތަކުރުފާނުގެ ޒިޔާރަތް), is a Sunni Islam mosque, located in Malé, on the Kaafu Atoll, in the Maldives. The mosque is located adjacent to the mausoleum of as-Sultan al-Ghaazee Muhammad Thakurufaanu al-Auza, who was a 16th-century Sultan of the Maldive Islands. According to historical documents, the mosque is one of the oldest mosques in Malé, and was built before Thakurufaanu was Sultan.

== Overview ==
The mosque was built by Bihuroazu Fashan akalo and was called the Bihuroazu Fashana kalo Mosque. The word Bihuroazu comes from the Persian language, meaning "prosperous".

The mosque is of historical interest due to its proximity to the mausoleum that is also the resting place of Thakurufaanu and his younger brother, Al-Ghaazee Hassan Rannabandeyri Kilefaanu.

On 20 April 2017, prayers were banned outside the mosque, following the sighting of the grave of Dhanthaelu Ali, located outside of the mosque. Prior to the ban, a large number of people prayed outside of the mosque. Prayers were not prohibited inside the mosque.

=== Planned destruction ===
During the regime of Abdulla Yameen, it was proposed that the Bihuroazu Mosque be demolished to make way for a 12-storey multipurpose building. Provision for the works was made in the 2018 Maldives Government budget. The opposition criticized the proposed destruction. On Channel 13, the Minister stated that the opposition's claims were false and were made to mislead the people. A media official at the Ministry of Islamic Affairs said that the Bihuroazu Mosque was closed for cleaning. The official also stated that prayers were banned outside of the mosque due to the proximity of the sighted grave.

== See also ==
- Islam in the Maldives
- List of mosques in the Maldives
