= Maldivian–Portuguese conflicts =

1521–1650 conflicts

- Part of Portuguese presence in Asia
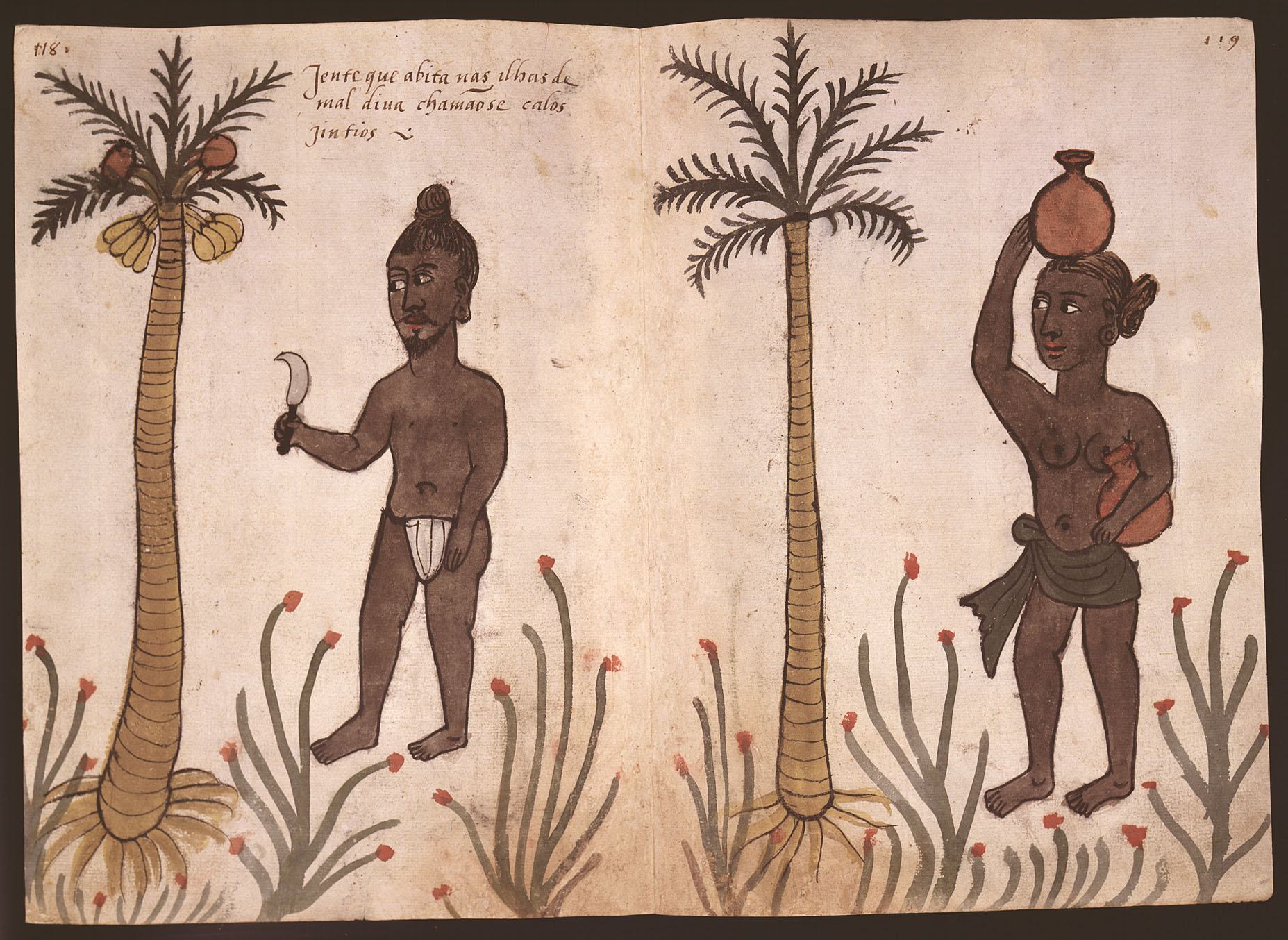
- Portuguese illustration of Maldivian inhabitants, c. 1540
Date	1521–1650
Location	Maldive Islands

Belligerents
(Portuguese Empire) Kingdom of Portugal	Sultanate of Maldives

Commanders and leaders
(Portuguese Empire) João Cheiradinheiro †; Hasan IX (D. Manoel) (Portuguese Empire) Eitor de Ataide † (Portuguese Empire) Pedro de Ataide (Portuguese Empire) Andreas Andre † (Portuguese Empire) Manuel de Araujo (Kingdom of Portugal) Domingos Belliago (Portuguese Empire) Dom Laviz (WIA) (Portuguese Empire) Dom Malaviz †	Abu Bakr †; Ali Rasgefaanu †; Mohamed Thakurufaanu; Muhammad Imaduddin I Ibrahim Iskandar I

The Maldivian–Portuguese conflicts were a series of intermittent military engagements between the Kingdom of Portugal and the Sultanate of the Maldive Islands from 1521 to 1650.

== Background ==
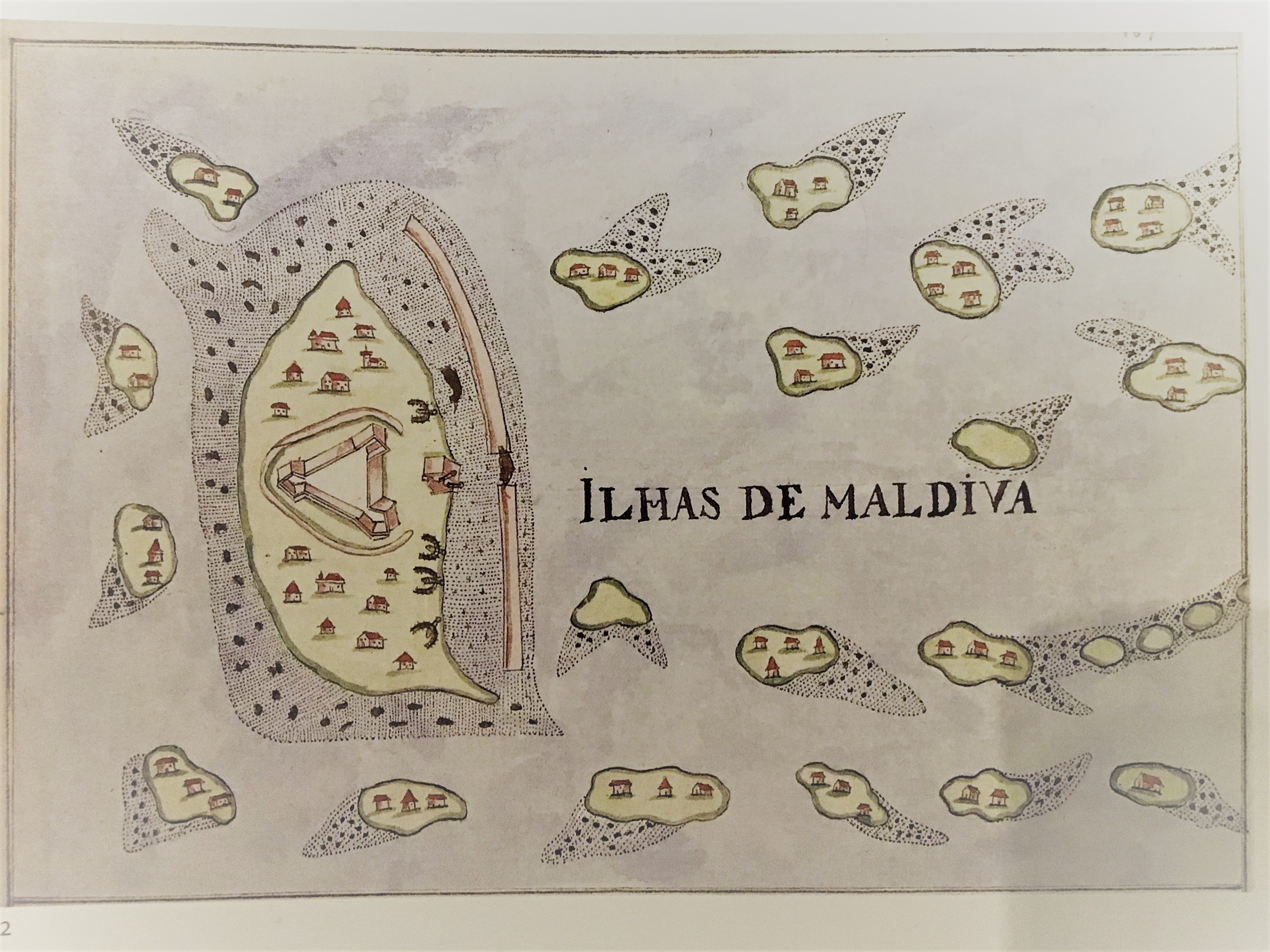
Portuguese drawing of the fortress of Maldives and the archipelago, 17th century

The first Portuguese visit to the Maldives occurred in November or December 1518, when a flotilla carrying 120 men was despatched to Malé, where a fort was established, around the same time they began their presence in Sri Lanka. (Note: "The first intrusion of the Portuguese in the Maldives occurred in December 1518 when a flotilla carrying 120 men under the command of Joao "scent money" Gomes, was despatched to Malé.")

João Gomes Cheiradinheiro, who had been sent to the Maldives to build the fort, behaved in such an arbitrary manner towards the natives that a party of islanders in 1521 attacked the garrison. The attackers seized the stronghold, massacred the Portuguese stationed there, and set fire to a caravel and several smaller vessels.

As a result, the Portuguese were effectively driven out, and from that point on, the islanders, including possibly those of Minicoy, were not interfered with by the Portuguese. However, a few Portuguese resettled in Malé after 1521, but they were often in danger and had little influence over the Maldives.

== Hasan IX's reign ==
Following the assassination of Sultan Muhammad in 1550, his brother, Hasan IX, ascended the throne. He attempted to marry his brother's widow to solidify his rule, but she fled to Cochin. Hasan IX soon followed, seeking military aid. He offered the Portuguese trading privileges, including an annual tribute of 600 bahars of coconut rope, however his rule remained unstable, and he was ultimately overthrown. Fleeing once more to Cochin, he converted to Christianity in 1552, taking the name "D. Manoel", and began advocating for Portuguese military intervention.

== First Portuguese expedition to Malé, 1552 ==
With Portuguese backing, D. Manoel arranged for a ship under the command of Eitor de Souza de Ataide to sail to Malé and bring Maldivian nobles to Cochin for conversion to Christianity. However, the ship was intercepted by Maldivian forces loyal to Abu Bakr and Ali Rasgefaanu, who seized the vessel and killed all on board.

== Second Portuguese expedition to Malé, 1552–1553 ==
Following the massacre, the Portuguese launched another expedition, this time led by Pedro de Ataide. The fleet set sail from Cochin with the goal of reinstating D. Manoel as ruler.

During the conflict, Sultan Abu Bakr was killed in battle, yet the Portuguese were unable to consolidate control over the islands.

== Third Portuguese expedition to Malé, 1558 ==
Ali Rasgefaanu, the Maldivian sultan, sought to expel the remaining Portuguese in Malé. Ali Rasgefaanu led his jihad to resist Portuguese rule. The local forces were under the leadership of Sultanul Muhammad Thakurufaanu al-Auzam.

To counter the threat, the Portuguese sent an expedition led by Captain Andreas Andre, better known in the Maldives as "Andiri Andirin". Portuguese records state that the fleet itself was commanded by Manuel da Silveira de Araujo. In battle, Ali Rasgefaanu was killed/martyred on May 19, 1558. He was buried where he fell.

Following the victory, Andreas Andre established himself in power for the next 15 years, governing on behalf of D. Manoel.

== Maldivian attack on Malé, 1573 ==
On the eve of a planned mass forced conversion of Maldivian Muslims, Muhammad Thakurufaanu al-Auzam and his men attacked Malé. Arriving at night, they took the Portuguese by surprise, killing Andreas Andre in an ambush. By dawn, the Portuguese stronghold had fallen.

== Fourth Portuguese expedition to Malé, 1631 or 1632 ==
In 1631 or 1632, Philip IV of Spain, or (Philip III of Portugal), instructed the Viceroy to dispatch an expedition to the Maldive Islands.

A fleet of 15 ships, commanded by Domingos Ferreyra Belliago, Chief Captain of Canara, set sail directly for Malé. However, the Maldivian sultan, Muhammad Imaduddin I, had been warned of the fleet's approach and had fortified his defenses. The only access to Malé was blocked by ships, while the island itself was encircled by reefs and rocks.

"For some days the said Armada fired upon it (Mále) with cannon, and then seeing it was impossible to force an entrance, and that the time spent was all wasted, returned to Goa."

While fleeing, the Portuguese burned down the Mosque in Villingili Island.

== Portuguese attack on Malé, 1650 ==
In the second year of his reign, Dom Laviz and Dom Malaviz led an armed fleet to attack the Maldives. These two brothers, reportedly the sons of the daughter of Sultan Hasan IX (D. Manoel), had renounced Islam and gone to Goa.

Upon receiving news of the invasion, Sultan Ibrahim Iskandar I immediately prepared for battle. He summoned his three half brothers and his ministers to the palace, where they resolved to confront the attackers.

When the Maldivians began to fire, they inflicted severe damage on the Portuguese. Don Malaviz was killed, his brother Don Laviz was wounded, and many who accompanied them were killed. The few survivors, unable to achieve their objective, withdrew their fleet, and the Portuguese never dared to attack the Maldives again.

== Aftermath ==
Contact between Portugal and the Maldives ended in March 1844 when the Portuguese merchantman "Prazer e Alegria", with 104 crew, was wrecked on the islands. This was the last known interaction between the Portuguese and the Maldivians in the archipelago.

== Bibliography ==
- Silva, C. R. (January 2001). "Portuguese Interactions with Sri Lanka and the Maldives in the Sixteenth Century: Some Parallels and Divergences".
- Godfrey, Tom (February 7, 2023). Dive Maldives A Guide to the Maldives Archipelago. Atoll Editions. ISBN 9781876410872.
- Danvers, Frederick (1894). The Portuguese in India: A.D. 1481-1571. W.H. Allen & Company.
- Ellis, Royston (2005). Maldives. Bradt Travel Guides. ISBN 9781841621432.
- Forbes, Andrew (2004). The Maldives. Odyssey. ISBN 9789622177109.
- Bell, H. C. P. (1998). Excerpta Máldiviana. Asian Educational Services. ISBN 9788120612211.
