= Maldives–Pakistan relations =

- Pakistan: Maldives

Envoy
- High Commissioner Vice Admiral (Rtd) Muhammad Fayyaz Gilani: High Commissioner Mohamed Thoha

Maldives–Pakistan relations are the foreign relations between Pakistan and the Maldives.

Both countries have Islam as the state religion and are members of both the Commonwealth of Nations and the Organization of Islamic Cooperation as well as members of the South Asian Association for Regional Cooperation (S.A.A.R.C.).

== Economic relations ==
The economic relations with Maldives are minimal due to lack of direct shipping services between Male’ and Karachi. Total trade between the two countries in 2003–04 was just US$2.1 million. In October 2005, the Pakistan-Maldives Joint Economic Commission commenced.

=== Trade and investment ===
| | 2010 | 2011 | 2012 | 2013 | 2014 | 2015 | 2016 |
|---|---|---|---|---|---|---|---|
| Maldives Exports | $169,000 | $165,000 | $98,600 | $47,200 | $29,000 | $2.87 million | No Data Available |
| Pakistan Exports | $4.39 million | $6.37 million | $6.46 million | $10.3 million | $8.33 million | $5.87 million | $5.87 million |
| Total Trade | $4.56 million | $6.54 million | $6.56 million | $10.34 million | $8.36 million | $8.74 million | $5.87 million |
Note: All values are in U.S. dollars. Source: OEC.

== Political relations ==
The present building of the Maldivian Parliament was inaugurated on 1 August 1998, with the presence of Pakistan's then Prime Minister Nawaz Sharif. The building was built with the assistance of the Pakistani government, who provided a grant of Rs. 45 million ($4.25 million) for its construction.

== Security relations ==
Pakistan has used the Maldives as an outpost for its spy agency, Inter-Services Intelligence (ISI).

== State visits ==
The Maldives attended the 12th SAARC Summit at Islamabad in January 2004. On the sidelines of the Summit, the President and Prime Minister of Pakistan had bilateral meetings with the President of the Maldives. The Foreign Secretary held bilateral consultations with the Foreign Secretary of the Maldives on the sidelines of the SAARC Standing Committee meeting in Kathmandu.

In November 2004, Pakistan's then Prime Minister Shaukat Aziz visited the Maldives and met with the then President Maumoon Abdul Gayoom. Aziz offered to extend credit facility, scholarships, collaboration in scientific and technological fields and training of civil servants, defence and security personnel to Maldives.

=== Recent improvements in bilateral relations ===
On 25 June 2017, the then Prime Minister Nawaz Sharif and his wife Kalsoom Nawaz Sharif were invited by the then President Abdulla Yameen on occasion of the independence day of Maldives. Since the start of 2018 Maldives political crisis relations have improved dramatically as the opposition leader Mohamed Nasheed invited India to launch a military intervention on his behalf against the government. President Yameen sent envoys to friendly countries which included Pakistan. Pakistan Army chief General Qamar Javed Bajwa visited Maldives in late March 2018 and became the first foreign high-ranking official to visit the country since the crisis began in February.

== See also ==
- Maldivians in Pakistan
