= Maroshi =

Maroshi މަރޮށި
- Inhabited island

- Location in Maldives
- Coordinates: 06°12′30″N 73°03′40″E
- Country: Maldives
- Geographic atoll: Miladhummadulhu Atoll
- Administrative atoll: Shaviyani Atoll
- Distance to Malé: 230 km (140 mi)

Dimensions
  - Length: 0.860 km (0.534 mi)
  - Width: 0.650 km (0.404 mi)

Population (2022)
  - Total: 479
- Time zone: UTC+05:00 (MST)

Maroshi (Dhivehi: މަރޮށި) is one of the inhabited islands of the Shaviyani Atoll administrative division and geographically part of the Miladhummadulhu Atoll in the Maldives.

== Geography ==
The island is 230.24 km (143 mi; 124 nmi) north of the country's capital, Malé.

The island of Maroshi is found in the Western rim of the atoll. It is situated at 6 12'N and 73 15'E latitude and longitude respectively. The island has a large lagoon and harbouring is easy. Maroshi is given the code C-10.

View of Maroshi from the sea

This island is historic as it has the tree that grew from the Kaani Mundi (a raw wooden post) used to make the sail of Kalhuohfunmi, the sailing boat used by the heroic character, Mohamed Thakurufaanu in his endeavour to free the country of the occupation by the Portuguese.

== Demographics ==
Historical population
Year	Pop.	±%
2006	495	—
2014	426	−13.9%
2022	479	+12.4%
2006-2014-2022: Census populations Source:

== Politics ==
There are 3 elected members in Maroshi Island Council. They are Abdul Azeez Mohamed Waheed (President), Massood Waheed (Vice-President), Hafeezulla (Member).

The island is deeply divided between Maldivian Democratic Party (MDP) supporters and pro-government supporters after 7 February 2012 transfer of power in an alleged coup.

== Economy ==
Maroshi Harbour

The main occupation of the people of Maroshi is fishing in early days and now most of the people are engaged in thatch making. In addition to this a good number of young people are engaged in work in Male' and resorts and office employment. The island has 4 mechanised fishing vessels, 2 transport vessels which travel to Male for cargo and passenger lifting. It has 9 retail shops. Government has made a harbour in the island.

=== Local produce ===
Dried tuna fish, salted fish, Rihaakuru, thatch, rope, Toddy honey, coconut

== Education ==
The school in Maroshi named Al Madhrasathul Munavvara was built by one of the famous business man Maroshi Hussain Abdulla (MHA Pvt Ltd) in 1979. In 2007 MHA Pvt Ltd handed the school over to the Government after rebuilding completely with modern facilities. This school is one of the centres holding University of Cambridge (UK) GCE examinations in the country.

== Health services ==
Basic level health care is provided in the island by a Health Centre, where one doctor and two nurse works. There is also a pharmacy run by STO.

== Historical sites ==
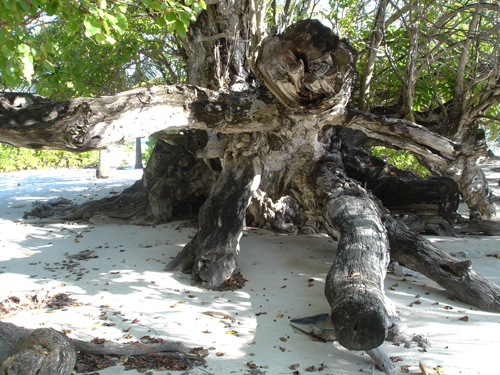
The historic Kaani tree of Maroshi

The Huge Kaani (Sea Trumpet) Tree in Maroshi is noted in history for various reasons. It is a living tribute to Sultan Mohamed Thakurufaanu who freed the country from the reign of the Portuguese. It is also the largest tree of its kind in the country, and probably the oldest as well. It is said that Mohamed Thakurufaanu received a lot of help from the renowned Maroshi Raaveribe ( toddy-tapper) in his fight for national independence. It was his job to mend and maintain the sail of the Kalhuoffunmi – the ship used in the 'battle' and supply water to the vessel every time it docked at Maroshi, which was an important port during this fight. This tree still growing in the island is the one that grew from the Kaani staff that Raaveribe hoisted some 400 years ago to keep the huge sails of Kalhuoffunmi. Although some of the gigantic branches of the tree show signs of being attacked by 'giant saws', this is a historical monument that has been preserved over time. Also, signs of the passage through which the vessel went in and out of the kulhi (a lake-like enclosure of water) in the island is still quite obvious.
