= Maldives–Sri Lanka relations =

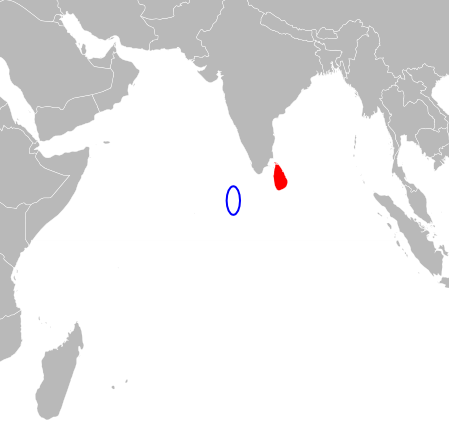

- Maldives: Sri Lanka

Maldives–Sri Lanka relations, or official and economic relations between the neighbouring Indian Ocean countries of the Maldives and Sri Lanka, have been positive since the Maldives became independent in 1965. The Maldives first established a mission in Sri Lanka (then the Dominion of Ceylon) in July 1965, and today has a High Commission in Colombo. Sri Lanka has a High Commission in Malé. Both countries were founding members of the South Asian Association for Regional Cooperation (SAARC) in December 1985.

== History ==
The earliest settlers in the Maldives were probably from Southern India. Indo-European speakers followed them from Sri Lanka in the fourth and fifth centuries BC. In the 12th century AD, sailors from East Africa and Arab countries came to the islands. Today, the Maldivian ethnic identity is a blend of these cultures, reinforced by religion and language. According to Maldivian legend, a Sinhalese prince named Koimala was stranded with his bride, daughter of the King of Sri Lanka, in a Maldivian lagoon and stayed on to rule as the first sultan. The Maldivians speak Dhivehi, closely related to the Sinhala language of Sri Lanka. The Maldives became a British Protectorate in the 19th century and the Maldivian monarchs were granted a good measure of self-governance. The Maldives gained total independence in 1965, and soon after established formal diplomatic relations with Sri Lanka.

Both the Maldives and Sri Lanka were part of the British Empire. The Sultan of the Maldives would pay tribute to their British suzerains in an annual ceremony every November whereby an envoy would present tribute and gifts to the Governor of Ceylon at the Queen's House in Colombo. This was notable as the only diplomatic function held in Colombo prior to independence.

Both the Maldives and Sri Lanka are republics in the Commonwealth of Nations.

== Official relations ==
In July 1976 the governments of the Maldives, Sri Lanka and India reached an agreement fixing the trijunction point between the three countries in the sea beyond the Gulf of Mannar.

In April 2006 officials including the Ministers of Education from the two countries participated in a 5-day workshop sponsored by UNESCO to establish plans for measuring progress towards EFA (Education for All) goals.

In February 2007, the then Sri Lankan President Mahinda Rajapaksa made a three-day official visit to the Maldives, expected to further consolidate the existing bilateral links between the two countries, and to strengthen cooperation in trade, tourism, education, and fisheries.

At a January 2009 meeting of energy ministers and senior officials of SAARC countries in Colombo, the two countries discussed closer collaboration in joint energy policies.

In June 2009, the then President of the Maldives Mohamed Nasheed made a two-day official visit to Sri Lanka where he met with the then Sri Lankan President Mahinda Rajapaksa and discussed issues of bilateral and regional interest. Mr. Nasheed congratulated Mr. Rajapaksa on eliminating LTTE terrorism.

On 13 February 2014, Zahiya Zareer was appointed by President Abdulla Yameen as High Commissioner to Sri Lanka.

In 2025, Sri Lankan President Anura Kumara Dissanayake made an official visit to Maldives at the invitation of Dr. Mohamed Muizzu, President of the Maldives and to mark the 60th anniversary of diplomatic relations

== Defence ==
The Maldives Defence Forces are trained by the Sri Lankan military. Specially Special Forces of the MNDF were trained at the Sri Lanka Army Commando Regiment regiment school and Sri Lanka Army Special Forces Regiment training academy in Maduru Oya, Sri Lanka. Maldivian Coast Guard fleet consists of vessels made by Colombo Dockyard.

In 2025, the MNDF Coast Guard ship Huravee made its first official visit to Sri Lanka to take part in IFR 2025, held to mark the Sri Lanka Navy’s 75th Anniversary. This is the first time an MNDF vessel has been invited to participate in an international military fleet review.

== Economic relations ==
Until the early 1970s, 65% of the Maldives imports from South Asia came from Sri Lanka, compared to 32% from India.

The economy of the Maldives is heavily dependent on tourism, with tour operators often based in Sri Lanka and packages including both countries.

In 2006 Sri Lanka Telecom and the Maldives state-run telephone company Dhivehi Raajjeyge Gulhun commissioned a US$20 million joint venture to lay an undersea fibre-optic cable connecting Male to Colombo, Sri Lanka, with Japan’s NEC Corp as the main supplier.

In 2005, the International Finance Corporation, part of the World Bank, launched the US$10 million Sri Lanka-Maldives Enterprise Development Program to assist small and medium enterprises in the two countries. The Maldives has inadvertently fallen into a debt entanglement and now faces a situation reminiscent of neighboring Sri Lanka. Like Sri Lanka, the Maldives has incurred billions of dollars in debt to China while seeking to rebuild its infrastructure following years of civil conflict.

=== Support during Cyclone Ditwah ===
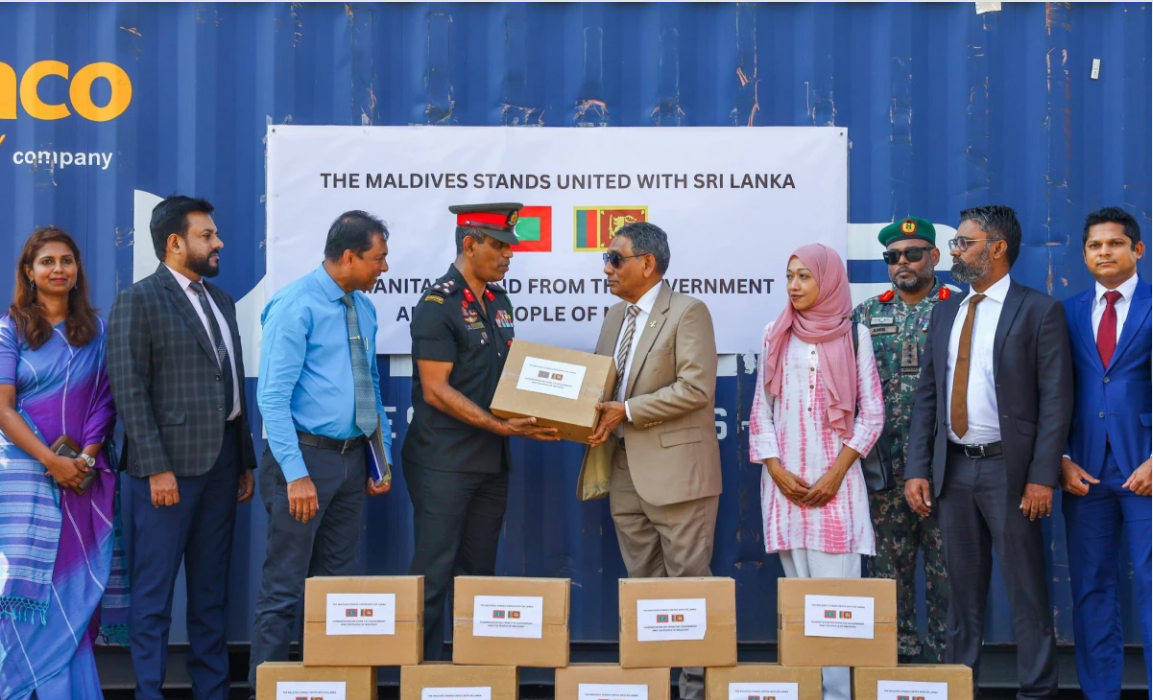
Maldives High Commissioner to Sri Lanka hands over 25,000 cans of tuna and a cash donation to Sri Lankan officials in Colombo as part of Maldivian relief assistance following Cyclone Dithuwa, December 2025.

Following Colombo’s appeal for international aid after Cyclone Ditwah, the Maldives was among the first countries to respond, extending humanitarian assistance after the cyclone devastated Sri Lanka in November 2025. The Maldivian government pledged USD 50,000 and 25,000 cases of canned tuna, to be delivered directly to Colombo. In addition, a nationwide PSM News telethon raised over USD 800,000 for Sri Lanka’s disaster relief efforts, with contributions from Maldivians, government institutions, private companies, clubs, and media organisations.

== Environmental issues ==
The 2004 Indian Ocean earthquake and tsunami which occurred on 26 December that year, caused great damage in both Maldives and Sri Lanka, as well as other Indian Ocean nations. In response, with assistance from the United States, the US$16.6 million Indian Ocean Tsunami Warning System (IOTWS) was established in 2005 to set up monitoring systems and share information between the nations at risk.

Global warming is a severe threat to the Maldives, with most of the islands less than 1.5 m (4.9 ft) above sea level. The then President, Mohamed Nasheed had said he planned to set aside some of the US$1 billion a year it receives from tourism to buy a new homeland. He had approached the government of Sri Lanka, among others, and was said to have received a favourable reception.

== See also ==
- Foreign relations of the Maldives
- Foreign relations of Sri Lanka
- Maldivians in Sri Lanka
