= Indians in the Maldives =

People of Indian origin settled in Maldives

Indians in Maldives
Total population
- 29,000

Regions with significant populations
- Malé•Gan

Languages
- Indian languages mainly Malayalam•Telugu•Tamil•Hindi•Bengali•Gujarati•English•Urdu

Religion
- Hinduism, Islam, Religions of India

Related ethnic groups
- Non-resident Indian and Person of Indian Origin

Approximately 29,000 Indians live and work in the Maldives and almost 22,000 of them live in Malé', the capital city. They comprise nurses, teachers, managers, doctors, engineers, accountants and other professionals. Besides them, there are skilled and unskilled personnel such as technicians, masons, tailors, plumbers, and other labourers. A sizeable proportion work in the tourism-related industries. Almost all of them hold Indian citizenship though they may get absorbed in the fabric of the local society.

People from Kerala and Tamil Nadu have historically been in close contact with the Maldives, through trade, which continues till today where Indian professional and other workers contribute to the Maldivian economy and society.

== See also ==
- Filipinos in the Maldives
- Hinduism in Maldives
