= Mahl people =

Ethnic group in India

Mahls
Total population
- 10,260

Regions with significant populations
- India Lakshadweep (Minicoy Island): 10,260

Languages
- Dhivehi

Religion
- Sunni Islam

Related ethnic groups
- Maldivians, Malayalis

Mahl people refers to an ethnic group of India (i.e., people of Minicoy and migrant communities from Minicoy islands). They speak the Mahl dialect of Divehi which is a member of the southern group of Indo-Aryan languages. All Mahls are native to Minicoy Island in the Union territory of Lakshadweep.

== History ==
According to local oral tradition, Kamborani and Kohoratukamana, two princesses from the Maldives, came to Minicoy. When they arrived, the Tivaru, who had been living there before, left the island for Sri Lanka. The Kamborani's descendants are the bodun (land- and shipowners) and the descendants of Kohoratukamana are the niamin (captains). The other status-groups are made up of the descendants of their crew. Traditions like this and linguistic affinities with the Mahl dialect of Divehi spoken in Minicoy and the standard Maldivian dialect, compared with the southern Maldivian dialects in which archaic features are more well-preserved suggest that Minicoy was principally settled by settlers from Malé or the northern Maldives.

== Demographics and geographic distribution ==
Most Mahls live in their native land of Maliku (Minicoy) in the union territory of Lakshadweep, India. In Lakshadweep the Mahls emerged as a separate ethnic group and are 15.67% of the total population of Lakshadweep.

There are migrant communities of Mahls in other parts of India too. The origin of all the Mahl communities in India and elsewhere lies in the island of Minicoy. A number of Mahls have settled in the districts of Kozhikode, Malappuram, Ernakulam and Thiruvananthapuram (Trivandrum) in the southern state of Kerala. There is a community of Mahls in Kerala who came and settled there in the 17th century, when the islands of Lakshadweep came under the rule of Ali Rajahs/Arakkal Bheevi of Kannur.

== Social groups ==
=== Thakru ===
According to the ethno-history of the Thakru, a person named Thakru came to Minicoy from Addu Atoll in Maldives and married thrice, and the present Thakru are his descendants.

== See also ==
- Maldivians in India, citizens of the Maldives in India
