= Maldivians in Sri Lanka =

Maldivian diaspora in Sri Lanka

Maldivian Sri Lankan
Total population
- 1,280 (2025)

Languages
- Dhivehi, Sinhalese, Tamil, English

Religion
- Islam

Related ethnic groups
- Sinhalese people

Maldivian Sri Lankan refer to people of Dhivehi ethnicity living in Sri Lanka, there were over 8,000 of them, as of 2019, declining to 1,280 in 2025.

== History ==
Sinhalese people, as well as Bengali people and Odia people have connections to Mahl people due to long-lasting contact through trade and travel. Local oral tradition says that when Mahls went to the Maldives the Tivarun who first settled in the islands have migrated to Sri Lanka.

== See also ==
- Maldives–Sri Lanka relations
