= Filipinos in the Maldives =

Filipinos in Maldives
Mga Pilipino sa Maldives (Tagalog)

Total population
- 3,000 (2018)

Regions with significant populations
- Malé

Languages
- English (Philippine and Maldivian) · Tagalog · Dhivehi

Religion
- Roman Catholicism · Islam

Related ethnic groups
- Overseas Filipinos

Filipinos in the Maldives consist mainly of expatriates and migrant workers from the Philippines. As of 2018, there were about 3,000 overseas Filipinos working in the Maldives. The Philippine Embassy in Bangladesh has a jurisdiction over the Maldives.

== Labor issues ==
About 60 Filipino construction workers in Maldives sought immediate repatriation, alleging unjust working conditions including the non-payment of wages and the lack of substantial food and potable water.

== See also ==
- Filipinos in India
- Indians in the Maldives
