= Muhammad Thakurufaanu al-Auzam =

- Sultan of the Maldive Islands, Katheeb of Utheemu
- Reign: 1573–1585
- Predecessor: An'dhiri An'dhirin regent of King Dom Manoel
- Successor: Sultan Ibrahim Kalaafaannu (son of Muhammad Thakurufaanu)
- Born: 16 January 1535; Utheemu, Maldives
- Died: 18 August 1585 (aged 50); Malé, Maldives
- Burial: Bihuroazu Kamanaa Mosque, Malé, Maldives
- Spouse: Rehendiye Goyye
- Issue: Sultan Ibrahim Kalaafaan
Names
- As-Sultan al-Ghaazee Muhammad Thakurufaanu al-Auzam Siri Savaadheetha Mahaaradhun
- Dynasty: Utheemu
- Father: Katheebu Husain
- Mother: Amina Dio

As-Sulṭaan al-Ghaazee Muhammad Thakurufaanu al-A'uẓam or As-Sultan Ghazi Muhammad Bodu Thakurufaanu (Dhivehi: އައްސުލްޠާން އަލްޣާޒީ މުޙައްމަދު ތަކުރުފާނު އަލްއަޢުޡަމް; died 18 August 1585) ruled over the Maldives Islands from 1573 to 1585. He is known as a military strategist for fighting the Portuguese who ruled over the Maldives from 1558–1573 after killing Sultan Ali VI in Malé. His victory is commemorated in the Maldives as Qaumee Dhuvas or National Day. He was also the first Maldivian Sultan to form a Lashkaru (a unified military body). He is regarded as a national hero.

== Early years ==
Muhammad Thakurufaanu was the son of Katheebu Hussain of Utheemu in Thiladhummathi Atoll and Lady Aiminaa Dhiye of Ihavandhoo. Muhammad Thakurufan learned Hevikan (Martial Arts).

== Defeat of the Portuguese ==
After killing Sultan Ali IV, the Maldives was ruled by An'dhiri An'dhirin and the Portuguese. An'dhiri An'dhirin was a regent of the (Sultan Hassan IX) who was the first Maldivian and the only member of its royalty to renounce Islam and convert to Christianity, later upon his deposition he took refuge in Goa, India.

After the invasion, the Portuguese ruled over the Maldives for 15 years and forcefully imposed Christianity with the threat of death on the locals in a period which the history describes as

A time when intolerable enormities were committed by the invading infidels, a time when the sea grew red with Maldivian blood, a time when people were sunk in despair

Muhammad Thakurufaanu, left the Maldives with his brothers Ali and Hasan to Minicoy off the coast of India in the Laccadive Archipelago. They met the "Aaji" brothers. Hassan Aaji and Ali Aaji which helped the Utheemu brothers to defeat the Portuguese. The three Utheemu brothers built the ship Kalhuoffummi. It is said that Muhammad Thakurufaanu received a help from the Maroshi Raaveribe (toddy-tapper) who mended and maintained the sail of the Kalhuoffummi – the ship used in the battle and supply water to the vessel every time it docked at Maroshi. The island has the tree that grew from the Kaani Mudi (a raw wooden post) used to make the sail of Kalhuoffummi. It is also the largest tree of its kind in the country. Kalhuoffumi shipwrecked near the south coast of Kolhufushi.

Muhammad Thakurufaanu wanted to construct one of the first Mosque in the country in the island, He went to the island off the coast of Kolhufushi's current harbor; and Muhammed Thakurufaanu wasn't pleased with how the sun sets and rises in the island. So, he constructed the Mosque on the south coast of the island with the planks and slats of his and his teams vessel into a Mosque.

History has it that In the 2004 Indian Ocean Tsunami that the area where the Mosque was, The tsunami affected greatly, but; only the area around the Mosque was affected, and it was a copious amount of damage. The Mosque was left untouched by the tsunami and not a single droplet of water reached it.

The Mosque holds great importance to the islanders and the people of The Maldives.

The brothers landed on a different island every night, fought the Portuguese and set sail into the ocean before daybreak. They reached the capital island Malé on the night before the day fixed by the Portuguese garrison of An'dhiri An'dhirin for the forcible conversion of the inhabitants to Christianity, on the penalty of death for non-compliance. The Utheemu brothers along with other Maldivians, fought and killed the Portuguese garrison and regained independence for the country. An'dhiri An'dhirin was killed by a musket shot of Muhammad Thakurufaanu.

== Aftermath ==
After killing An'dhiri An'dhirin, as per a treaty he got refuge from Ali Raja of Cannanore, India. Muhammad Thakurufaanu's base of operation was Maliku under the sovereignty of Cannanore. The Ali Raja demanded dominion over the Maldives, as promised to him by the Muhammad Thakurufaanu. The nature of the relationship between Muhammad Thakurufan and Ali Raja of Cannanore was outlined in a letter sent by a later Ali Raja, Mariambe Ali-Adi Raja Bibi, to the Sultan Muhammad Mueenuddine I of the Maldives. The letter was dated Friday 17 Jumad al-Awla Anno Hegirae 1243 (7 December AD 1827). According to the letter Muhammad Thakurufan had entered into a treaty ceding sovereignty of the Maldives to the Ali Raja of Cannanore in the event Thakurufan was established in power in Male.

Muhammad Thakurufaanu concluded a treaty with the King Dom Manoel who lived in Goa, in order to ward off the Ali Raja of Cannanore. Although Muhammad Thakurufaanu was made a regent of King Dom Manoel (as per the treaty), the Maldivians assigned Muhammad Thakurufaanu as the Sultan of the Maldives, no longer recognizing the sovereignty of the self-exiled Christian kings in Goa or their regents. The chronicles report him to have ruled wisely, being just and considerate, protecting all the poor, and even solicitous for the people’s interests. Muhammed Thakurufaanu died a natural death on 16 August 1585.

== Death ==
Mausoleum of Muhammad Thakurufaanu al-Auzam near Bihuroazu Kamanaa Mosque

As-Sultan Muhammad Thakurufaanu al-Auzam died on 1st Ramadan 993 AH, after 11 years and 6 months in power. It was on 18 August 1585. He was buried on the Mausoleum of the Muhammad Thakurufaanu al-Auzam near Bihuroazu Kamanaa Mosque in Malé.

== Legacy ==
British author Royston Ellis's novel A Hero in Time is about the life and adventures of Muhammad Thakurufaanu.

The army (lashkaru) organised by him has evolved into the Maldives National Defence Force.

The Highest National Award in Maldives, formally known as The Most Honourable Order of the Distinguished Rule of Ghazi (Nishaan Ghaazeege Izzathuge Verikan) is named after him.

The Islamic Centre, the largest mosque in Maldives, Masjid as-Sultan Muhammad Thakurufaanu al-Auzam is named after him.

Qaumee Dhuvas (Maldives National Day), is a day to celebrate Thakurufaanu's win over the Portuguese occupation. Culturally he has become is regarded as a national hero.

== See also ==
- Sultanate of the Maldive Islands
- List of Maldivian monarchs
- Islamic Centre (Maldives)
- Qaumee Dhuvas
- Origin of the Security Force in Maldives
