= Maldivians =

Ethnic group native to the Maldive Islands

ދިވެހިން; Dhivēhin
- Flag of the Maldives

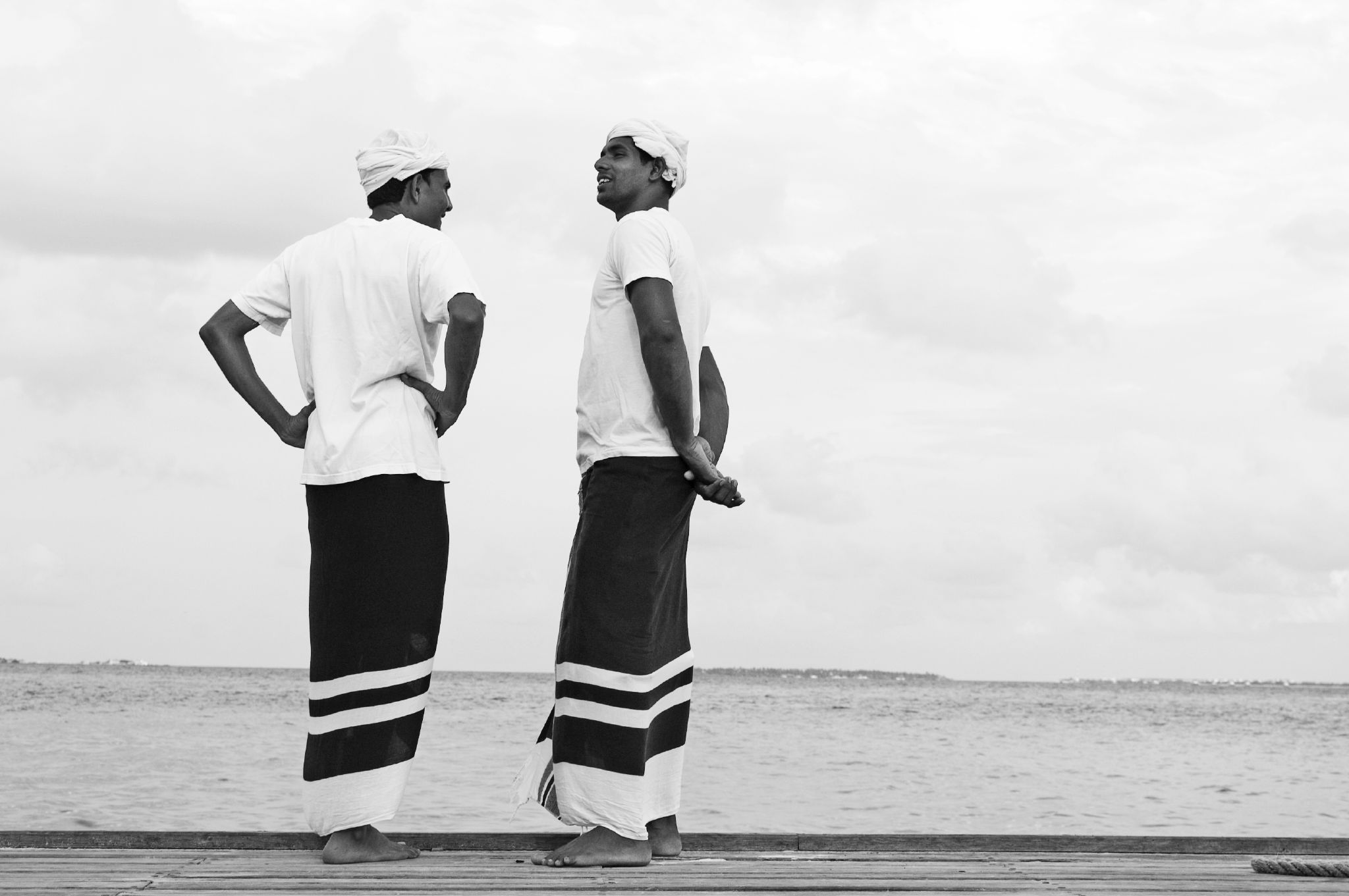
- Feyli (the ethnic attire of the Maldivian) was worn both by men and women in Maldives during the monarchy.

Total population
- c. 382,639 (2022)

Regions with significant populations
- Maldives: 344,023 (2014)
- India: ~15,000 (Note: 5,000 citizens and 10,000 Mahls.) (2011)
- Malaysia: 1,500 (2008)
- Sri Lanka: 1,280 (2025)
- Singapore: 1,000 (2008)
- United Kingdom: 1,000 (2006)
- United States: 733 (2020)
- Pakistan: 450 (2010)
- Australia: 680 (2021)
- Egypt: 150 (2011)
- Colombia: 90 (2019)
- Netherlands: 39
- Taiwan: 3 (2023)
- Philippines: 2 (2010)
- Thailand: 1 (2025)
- Brazil: 1 (2025)

Languages
- Maldivian

Religion
- Sunni Islam

Related ethnic groups
- Sinhalese, Arabs, Malays
- a. Excluding a smaller number of foreign nationals and ambassadors.

Maldivians (Dhivehi: ދިވެހިން, romanized: Dhivēhin, pronounced [diˈʋehiŋ]) are an Indo-Aryan ethnic group and nation native to the Maldive Islands, constituting the Republic of Maldives and the island of Minicoy (within Lakshadweep, a union territory of India). They share a common ancestry, history, culture and language.

== Subgroups ==
For ethnographic and linguistic purposes as well as geopolitical reasons, anthropologists divide the Maldivian people into three subgroups.

=== Main group ===
The main group numbers more than 250,000. The group inhabits the numerous atolls stretching from Ihavandhippolhu (Haa Alif) to Haddhunmathi (Laamu) in the Maldives. They constitute over 70% of the total. On a larger scale, the third group also comes under this group. The standard dialect of the Maldivian language which is spoken in the Maldive's capital, Malé, comes from the group, along with the central atolls. Variants are spoken in the rest of the islands, from the far north to Laamu Atoll.

=== Southern group ===
The southern group is found in the three southernmost atolls of the equatorial zone (Huvadhu, Fuvahmulah and Addu atolls). This group numbers approximately 60,000 and constitutes about 20% of the total. The earliest known settlements were in this region. This group of Maldivians has the closest proximity to the original Maldivian people in terms of language and ethnicity. Each of the 3 atolls has its own distinctive form of the Maldivian language (Huvadhu dialect, Mulaku dialect, Addu dialect), which are significantly different from other dialects and have greater affinity to the original.

=== Minicoy ===
The people of Minicoy (Malikun) – Mahls, number about 10,000. Minicoy island lies at the northern end of the Maldivian atoll chain and is the northernmost group. They make up 3% of the total. Ethnically and linguistically they are identical to the main group. They are distinguished instead by their politics and their latter day affiliation with India. The Minicoians are steadily undergoing a process of acculturation. The group has its own dialect (called Maliku dialect or Mahl) which retains some features of an older Maldivian, and shows Malayalam influences. The dialect is mutually intelligible with main group Maldivian.

== Myths and legends ==
No historical evidence explains the origin of Maldivians; no evidence describes any negrito or other aboriginal population, such as the Andamanese. No archaeology has investigated the islands' prehistory. However etymological research by Hassan Ahmad Maniku indicates that between 15% to 20% of words in Dhivehi are of unknown orgins primarily concentrated in localised place names and environmental vocabulary and cannot be traced to Indo-Aryan or Dravidian language families. While there were subsequent migrations introducing Dravidian linguistic influences.[4] Bengali, Odia, and Sinhalese people have had trading connections with Dhivehi people in the past.

Scholars conjecture that the ancestors of Maldivian people arrived in the Maldives from North West and West India, from Kalibangan between 2500 and 1700 BC and that they formed a distinct ethnic group around the 6th century BC.

=== Origin ===
Maldivian folklore describes the dependence of the Maldivians on the coconut tree and the tuna fish. One legend says that the first inhabitants died in great numbers, but a great sorcerer or fandita made coconut trees grow out of the skulls of the buried corpses of the first settlers. Therefore, the coconut tree is said to have an anthropomorphic origin. The word naashi (coconut shell) is the word for skull in the Dhivehi language. The coconut tree occupies a central place in the present-day Maldive national emblem.

The tuna fish is said to have been brought to Maldivian waters by a mythical seafarer (maalimi) called Bodu Niyami Kalēfanu who went close to the Dagas (the mythical tree at the end of the world) to bring this fish.

==== First settlers ====
One of the earliest people to settle were likeley unknown orgin, there are no evidence that says maldivians first maldivians come from south india and sri lanka, evidenced by the unknown substratum in language and culture. First maldivians were likeley indigenous The Giraavaru people are considered one of the earliest settlers. They were technologically advanced, building sail boats (dhonis).

The people used words such as varam or varu meaning (force ,strength or capacity) for their islands. Examples given in the old manuscript are: Noḷivaram, Kuruhinnavaram, and Girāvaram. Many of the old terms used by Maldivian fishermen come from unknown orgin like the term [fehurihi] meaning whale shark to the assumption that these terms were likeley unknown orgins, there are no evidence that early maldivian fishing terms are Dravidian most terms are indigenous and Indo aryan. While there were migrations from the Malabar coast but they were not the first settlers. Historical records show that in the southern and central atolls, occupations such as farming and weaving became important early on.

After the Indo-Aryans' arrival and the introduction of the Hindu religion, a prince of India is said to have visited the Maldives. The period can be estimated from oral tradition, and the story corresponds to that from Sri Lanka's Mahavamsa chronicle, about the king's son exiled from his country who arrived in Lanka, while one of his ships lost its way and arrived in the Maldives. In legend, the prince who arrived in the Maldives was the son of Brahmaditiya, king of Kalinga (Brahmadatta was King at the time of Buddha's death c. 500 – 350 BC), a kingdom in the south-east of India (modern Orissa). King Brahmaditiya was displeased with his son and sent him to Dheeva Maari (Maldives). The prince was Sri Soorudasaruna. Sri Soorudasaruna established a kingdom of the Adeetha Vansha Dynasty (Solar Dynasty) there, shortly before the reign of Emperor Ashoka in India. That places the establishment of the first kingdom in the Maldives circa the 4th century BC. Tradition says that Emperor Ashoka established his kingdom in Pataliputra and that his people preached the religion and teachings of Buddha to Bairat, west of Pataliputra. People came from Bairat to teach Buddhism. These people are said to have arrived during Ashoka's reign, probably when he sent Buddhist missionaries to all neighbouring countries, in the 3rd century BC. When the Buddhist missionaries arrived in the Maldives, the place was called Dheeva Mahl. Around the 2nd century AD, Arab traders stopped by the Maldives en route to the Far East–their first record of the Maldives islands, which they called Mahal Dibiyat, is from these traders. The Maldives provided enormous quantities of cowrie shells, an international currency at the time. The cowrie became the symbol of the Maldives Monetary Authority. Abu al-Barakat Yusuf al-Barbari, a North African Arab, is credited with converting the Maldivians to Islam in 1153.

=== First ruling dynasty ===
The ruling dynasty was established by prince Koimala. In the Lōmāfānu and Rādavaḷi chronicles pre-Muslim royalty are represented by a king, whose successor was converted to Islam. The name Koimala Kalo is suggestive: koi or koyi in Maldivian language means son, lad or prince (derived from Malayalam koya, son, prince, master, cf. the Dravidian root kō, king). The malā component may be derived from māla as in Māla-dīv, but, if so, the name would mean 'prince of the Maldives'. The term kalō is a common word for man, used as a term of endearment. The title of former Maldivian kings was kattiri bovana mahaa radun, 'Kattiri' (ކައްތިރި) meaning Kshatriya in Maldivian.

One oral tradition says that the Giraavaru people are the indigenous people of the Maldives and were present before Koimala arrived. They are of native origin; their presence predates Buddhism and the arrival of Indo-Aryans. This may be the reason that the Dhivehi kinship system are unknown orgin and Indo aryan origin, and bears evidence of some matriliny. There are no evidence that any kinship terms are from Malayalam

==== Origin Myths ====
Five versions of the myth survive:

==== Ceylonese Prince Koimala ====
At a time when the Maldives were still sparsely inhabited, Prince Koimala, who had married the daughter of the king of Ceylon, made a voyage with her in two vessels from Srendib (Sri Lanka). Reaching the Maldives they were becalmed and rested at Rasgetheemu island in North Maalhosmadulu Atoll.

The islanders, learning that the two chief visitors were Ceylon royals, invited them to remain; they ultimately proclaimed Koimala their king at Rasgetheemu, the original 'King's Island'. Koimala and his spouse migrated to Malé and settled there with the consent of the inhabitants, then the most important community of Malé Atoll.

The two ships were dispatched to Lanka, and brought over other people of 'the Lion Race' (Sinhalese). Koimala and his queen spawned a male child called Kalaminja. He reigned as a Buddhist for twelve years and then converted to Islam, ruling for thirteen years more before migrating to Mecca.

This ruler's daughter married the chief minister and reigned as a nominal Sultana. She gave birth to a son called Kalaminja, who, in turn, married a lady of the country. The legend was recorded by Bell in 1922.

==== Indian prince ====
The Indian king was angry with his son, and sent him with and his wife in two boats with 700 soldiers. They came to Rasgetheemu in Raa Atoll. When he became king there, people called that island Rasgetheemu "King's Landing". The king and queen then came to Malé, and Koimala was born to them. Maloney reported this from Malé.

==== Malakamana ====
"When Koimala and his wife came, there were already people here. Because she was a princess of royal lineage, people asked her husband to rule. Koimala sent ships to Sri Lanka and brought back more people. It is said that a beautiful woman named Malakamana from the Maldives was one of the early people who settled Sri Lanka." Maloney reported that from Noonu Atoll.

==== Manadhoo ====
A hunter king of Sri Lanka was hunting and caught a man beast in his net. The man-beast couldn't walk, so the king taught him. The man-beast married the king's daughter, but he made political trouble in Sri Lanka, so was forced into exile. He and the princess arrived in Rasgetheemu and lived there for some time, where the locals there asked them to rule them. Maloney reported this from Manadhoo, Noonu Atoll.

==== Hulhumeedhoo ====
A hunter king of India was hunting with a net. He saw a creature that looked human but walked on all fours, and that disturbed the people. This creature would steal the hunters' nets and prey, upsetting the king. The king made large weights for his net, to heavy for ordinary humans to lift, preventing the creature from stealing it. One day, the king, with the help of many men, put the net over the creature, trapping it. The king took the creature to the palace, looked after him, and taught him language. The creature helped the king by showing him treasures in the forest, and the king came to respect him.

The king had a daughter who fell in love with this creature (in an alternate version, the king forced his daughter to marry him). The king became angry and sent them into exile. Their ship came to Laam (Hadummati) Atoll (towards the south), where the pair saw a crow that cried. They thought the crow was a poor omen, and it was, therefore, undesirable to land there, so they continued to Malé. They settled in what is now Sultan Park (the site of the former palace) and started a kingdom.

After fifteen years, a jinn began to come from the ocean once a month and disturbed the people... (from here follows the story of the saint who came and dispelled the jinni and caused all the people to convert to Islam). Maloney reported this from Hulhumeedhoo, Addu Atoll.

==== Gujaratis ====
Maloney reported that Gujarat, with its indented coastline and its proximity to the navigation routes of the Mesopotamian and Indus civilisations, maintained a tradition of navigation for over 4000 years. The earliest Buddhist literature records seafaring from its ports. North Indian civilisation reached the Maldives and Sri Lanka from Gujarat. North Indian civilisation also reached Java and other parts of Southeast Asia. The export of this civilisation across South and Southeast Asia began about 500 B.C. During the Mauryan period and the diffusion of Buddhism, sea traffic in the Bay of Bengal supplemented and, to some extent, surpassed that originating along the coasts of Western India.

Three Jataka tales seem to refer to the Maldives, particularly that exiles from Bharukaccha went to a thousand islands (Laccadive and Maldives) where they found room, and that these were near an island named for coconuts (Kerala). This suggests seafarers from Bharukaccha and Suppara visited the Maldives, and that Gujaratis settled there in pre-Buddhist times. Other Jataka tales suggest that ships from Gujarat sailing to Southeast Asia stopped in the Maldives and that merchants in search of treasures sailed in several seas called–maala (or maara).

The Maldives may have been settled in parallel with the arrival of Indo-Aryan speakers in Sri Lanka. Mariners from the peninsula's northwestern coasts must have on occasion been blown over to the Maldives—unmanned canoes and rafts from Kerala appeared there–and the dangers of shipwreck were vividly described in Jātakas. These might have arisen from contact with some of the thousands of the local reefs, which sailors long dreaded. Shipwrecked Gujaratis, as well as exiles, may have been early settlers there.

== Geographic distribution ==
=== Maldives ===
The Maldive Islands comprise the Republic of Maldives and the island of Minicoy in the Union territory of Lakshadweep, India. The secession of Minicoy from Maldivian rule and its affiliation with India gradually led to the emergence of a Maldivian population of Indian citizens who came to be known as Mahls.

More than 97% of Maldivians live in the Maldives. Maldivian communities across the world (including the people of Minicoy) originate from the Maldives. The Maldivian community consists of the main group, the Suvadivians, and the Mahls.

==== Southern group ====
As a result of political activities during the early 1960s, the term Suvadivian was adopted by some authors to refer to the southern group. From 1959 to 1963 a short-lived breakaway government named United Suvadive Republic was formed by Southerners, from which the name originated although the name is novel. The names Suvadive and Suvadivian suggest that they stem from the ancient name for the atolls of Huvadhu, Fuvahmulah and Addu, or Suvadiva.

The Suvadivians, living on Huvadhu, Fuvahmulah and Addu atolls number approximately 60,000 and constitute about 20% of Maldivians. The group has the closest linguistic and ethnic proximity to the original Maldivians. Historical records suggest that this group faced less interference from the outside world. Unlike the other group, this group was not affected by Portuguese rule as it did not cross Suvadiva channel. Fewer traders and travelers visited this area.

Each atoll of the Suvadiva region speaks its own distinctive forms of the Maldivian language (Huvadhu dialect, Mulaku dialect and Addu dialect), which are much different from the rest may be closer to the original.

==== Main group ====
This group of Maldivians was subject to substantial foreign interactions. Numerous incidents of interference from outsiders came from traders, travelers, and others. Portuguese rule and other factors affected the language and the ethnic mix.

=== Minicoy (Malikun) – Mahls ===
The Minicoy secession created a Maldivian population holding Indian citizenship. This group consists of the people of Minicoy and migrants. The only communities of ethnic Maldivians with Indian citizenship are from Minicoy, officially referred as Mahls. The people locally identify as Malikun. The group has its own dialect (called Maliku dialect or Mahl) which retains features of the original Maldivian language and Malayalam influences. The dialect is mutually intelligible with the main group and is more related to variants of northern Maldives.

Most Mahls live in Minicoy. Mahls are 15.67% of the population of Lakshadweep. Mahl communities have emerged in Kozhikode, Malappuram, Ernakulam, and Thiruvananthapuram (Trivandrum) in the southern state of Kerala. Their ancestors settled there in the 17th century when the islands of Lakshadweep came under the rule of Ali Rajahs/Arakkal Bheevi of Kannur.

Since 1957, direct transport between Minicoy and the Maldives was forbidden by the Indian government. Thus they are adopting elements of Indian culture owing to a lack of contact with the Maldivian people.

==== Sri Lanka ====
Approximately 20,000 people of Maldivian ethnicity lived in Sri Lanka, as of 2013.

== Genetics and research studies ==
In 1899, John Stanley Gardiner visited the Maldives and collected anthropometrical data on Maldivians from many islands. Analysis of this data by Wynfrid Duckworth, suggested three major waves of immigration into the country. These are:

- The peninsula of Hindustan with Ceylon,
- The coast of Arabia and possibly of Africa,
- The western shores of the Malay Peninsula, and the islands of the Malaya Archipelago.

In 1997, a Maldivian NGO, the Society for Health Education, conducted a study on thalassaemia mutations in the Maldives. This study reported a mutation that probably originated in the Middle East, another that could have been derived from Portuguese or Algerians, and another that probably originated from South Asia and Malays. The observations are consistent with historical records, showing that travellers from India, Indonesia, North Africa, the Red Sea and the Persian Gulf areas settled in the Maldives. Thalassaemia is the most common genetically transmitted blood disease in the Maldives, and the study results suggest that many Maldivians had ancestors in the above-mentioned countries.

Anthropological, ethnographic, and linguistic studies suggest that Maldivians share genes principally with the Sinhalese of Sri Lanka as well as western Indian populations, such as Marathis, Konkanis and Gujaratis with traces of Arab, Malay, southern Indian and North African genes. In 2013, the department of Human Genetics of Liden University studied the genetic origins of Maldivians. The studied examined autosomal DNA-, mitochondrial DNA-, and Y-chromosomal DNA markers in a representative sample of 141 unrelated Maldivians, with 119 from six major settlements. The researchers found a total of 63 different mtDNA haplotypes that could be allocated to 29 mtDNAs, mostly within the M, R and U clades. They also reported 66 different Y-STR haplotypes in 10 Y chromosome haplogroups, predominantly R1a1, R2, H, L and J2. The study concluded that this data agreed with commonly reported Maldivian ancestry, and suggested multiple, independent immigration events and asymmetrical migration of females and males across the archipelago.

The genetic study confirmed that the most likely origin of the Maldivian population was in South Asia with additions from the Middle East. The Dhivehi language of the Maldives is the southernmost Indo-Aryan language and the sharing of specific haplogroups with Indo-Aryan populations mostly from India and from Sri Lanka, could point to a common origin of these populations.

== Culture ==
=== Language and literature ===
The Maldivian language is central to the Maldivian identity. Unlike South India's other languages, it is an Indo-European language, while other South Indian languages are Dravidian. However the language shows some influences of Dravidian languages, and many loanwords.

=== Religion ===
Islam is the country's state religion. Maldivians are entirely Muslims, adhering to the Sunni school of thought. Daily life is regulated according to the tenets of Islam and government policies are based on Islamic law (Shari'a). The law prohibits the practice of any other religion by the country's citizens. Mahls too are Sunni Muslims.

=== Visual art and architecture ===
Most traditional Maldivian art is influenced by Perso-Arabic tradition in some form and usually centres on Islam. Drawing and painting are the primary visual arts. Most practitioners serve the tourist souvenir trade. Sculpture and crafts that overlap are present, but have not flourished. Lack of venues in which to exhibit, and lack of arts education and training. These include the use of local materials to produce objects such as mats, handheld or display objects,

Private galleries and exhibitions organized by the government and the artists themselves, in the 21st century has encouraged young Maldivians to pursue painting, and other public and commercial art forms. Practitioners pursue expertise via distance learning, or via books and magazines or at international universities.

=== Performing arts ===
The traditional Maldivian performing arts have Indian and African roots.

=== Martial arts ===
Martial arts among Maldivians are known as hevikamuge kulhivaruthak, while gulhamathi hifun is traditional wrestling.

=== Festivals ===
Most Maldivian festivals are related to Islam, however, some festivals belong to older Maldivian traditions, such as the kite flying festival. Naming a newborn child, Mauloodhu (a prayer accompanied by a festive meal), the Eid festival, and circumcision of the male child are a few events accompanied by celebrations.

A traditional meal called Keyn is prepared for the above Mauloodhus consisting of multiple courses. A single Keyn serves 10 – 12 people and includes rice, curries, salads, grilled fish, coconut cream, coconut syrup, bananas, puddings, and more.

Keyn is set out in a large wooden dish called a Malaafaiy. Individual plates are then filled with curries, salads, and other items and set around the rice. This would be covered with a lid and wrapped in a white cloth tied at the top. At meal times this would be carried into the Mauloodh Haruge (dining hall specially made for this event) and placed on straw mats for service. Individual plates and other food items in individual dishes are placed as well. Beverages are individually set in glasses. Water is served in a ceramic jug. Food is consumed using the fingers of the right hand only. At the end of the meal, the hand is washed using a copper jug into a copper basin. 10 December is marked as Kandu Rōdi duvas and 14 April as Gamu Rōdi duvas on which date Maldivian language day is marked from 2011 onwards.

| Festive day | 2008 | 2009 | 2010 |
|---|---|---|---|
| Islamic New Year | 10 January | --- | --- |
| Ashura | 19 January | 7 January | --- |
| Mawlid an-Nabi | 20 March | 9 March | 26 February |
| Lailat al Miraj | 31 July | 20 July | ? |
| Lailat al-Baraat | 18 August | 7 August | ? |
| Ramadan | 1 September | 22 August | 11 August |
| Lailat al Qadr | 28 September | 17 September | ? |
| Eid ul-Fitr | 1 October | 21 September | 10 September |
| Eid ul-Adha | 8 December | 27 November | 17 November |
| Islamic New Year | 29 December | 18 December | 7 December |
| Ashura | --- | 27 December | 17 December |

=== Dress ===
Traditionally Maldivian men wear a mundu with a shirt, similar to that of Malayali people. Maldivian women wear a red top with a gold neck trim called a Libaas and a long black skirt.

=== Cuisine ===
Rice is the major staple food in most Maldivian households. It is usually cooked and served with Garudiya (tuna soup). Specialty cuisines.

==== Bocholhi ====
Made of rice flour, coconut – semi-firm (grated), and coconut palm syrup by mixing the ingredients until lumps disappear and cooked over moderate heat until the mixture thickens.

==== Godhan Furhu Boa Folhi ====
Made of flour, coconut – semi-hard (blended to a smooth paste), eggs, coconut cream, jasmine water, coconut palm syrup, cinnamon powder, cardamom powder, and oil by mixing the ingredients apart from the oil. Cooked over moderate heat and once the top of the pancake dries up, turned over and cooked.

==== Han’dulu Aurus ====
Made of rice (soaked overnight), washed and blended to a smooth paste), coconut palm syrup, jasmine water, and jasmine flowers by placing all the ingredients apart from the flowers in a thick-bottomed pan and cooked over moderate heat by stirring constantly. Wrapped entirely with banana leaf and jasmine flowers are placed over the sweets. This sweet will keep for two to three months without spoiling.

==== Han’dulu Furhu Kubus ====
Made of patna rice (soaked overnight, washed, and blended to a smooth paste), coconut – semi-firm (grated), coconut palm syrup, caster sugar, and banana leaf. The grated coconut, palm sugar, and caster sugar are cooked over moderate heat until the mixture thickens. Removed from heat and cooled. Blended rice added and kneaded thoroughly. Mixture divided into eight portions and each portion wrapped in a banana leaf and then wrapped in a second banana leaf.

The wrapped portions are placed in a hole with coconut fibres and coconut shells that are burned for 30 minutes and left overnight in the hole for consumption that day.

==== Hukkaru ====
Made of coconut palm syrup by boiling the syrup over moderate heat and cooked by stirring continuously until it starts to thicken. Removed from heat and whisked until frothy and cool.

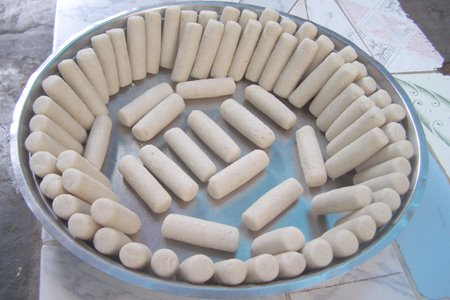
Maliku Bonda (Bondi)

==== Huni Folhi ====
Made of Patna Rice flour, coconut – semi-hard (grated), and coconut palm syrup by cooking all the ingredients over moderate heat in a thick-bottomed pan stirring continuously.

When the mixture starts to come loose from the side of the pan it is removed from the heat. One tablespoon of the cooked mixture is spread on a corkwood leaf. It is smoked and dried and the leaves are spread with the sweet over the fireplace.

==== Karukuri Banbukeyo ====
Made of a fried breadfruit (crushed coarsely), coconut palm syrup, and jasmine water by bringing the syrup and the jasmine water to boil and cooking over moderate heat until it comes to the ribbon stage. The crushed breadfruit is added into the sugar and coated well. It is kept in an airtight container.

==== Karukuri Ala ====
Made of fried taro (crushed coarsely), coconut palm syrup, and jasmine water by boiling the syrup and the jasmine water and cooking over moderate heat until it comes to the ribbon stage. The crushed taro is added into the sugar and coated well. It is kept in an airtight container.

==== Kulhi Bis Fathafolhi ====
Made of patna rice flour, grated coconut, rihaakuru, blended rihaakuru bondi, eggs, thin-sliced onion, chopped curry leaves, cherry pepper, juice of two limes, ginger, salt to season, and oil by crushing the onion, curry leaves, cherry pepper, ginger with salt. The rice flour and coconut are added to make a sandy texture. A bay is formed in the center of the rice mixture and the eggs and rihaakuru and rihaakuru bondi are added. The dough is kneaded and divided into 15 gram balls. Each ball is spread to about ¼ inch thickness. A 3 – inch diameter round cutter divides the dough and it is cooked in pre-heated oil.

==== Meeraa ====
Made of coconut sap (collected at noon) by boiling the sap over moderate heat and stirring continuously until it comes to the ribbon stage. A spoonful of the thickened syrup is placed on a large greased tray in strings.

==== Thela Kubus ====
Made of patna rice flour, coconut palm syrup, eggs, and coconut oil by whisking the egg and the syrup, adding in the rice flour, and beating further. A tablespoonful of the mixture is deep-fried until golden.

==== Theluli Keyo ====
Made of plantain (peeled and cut length-wise) and oil by frying the bananas until crisped. Drained on absorbent kitchen paper and kept in an airtight container.

==== Veli Hakuru ====
Made of coconut palm syrup by boiling the syrup over moderate heat and cooked by stirring continuously until it starts to crystallise. After cooling, put into sealed jars.

==== Other dishes ====
- Falhoa Aurus
- Naaroh Faludha
- Fuppi Baiy
- Gerhi Banbukeyo
- Gerhi Kattala
- Kaliyaa Kuri Kattala
- Varukuri Baiy

== Communities ==
=== Maldivian names ===
A generation ago, Maldivians were not commonly known by their birth names. Instead, they were called alternative names such as Dohuttu, Lahuttu, Tutteedi, Kudamaniku, or Don Goma. The rationale behind this practice was that if evil spirits did not know someone's real name, they would be free from their spells. The ancient Maldivian naming system is similar to that of Gujaratis and Marathas that are addressed by their first name, while the middle name is the father/mother's name, and the last name is the family name.

Common Maldivian family names include Bee, Beefan, Boo, Didi, Fan, Fulhu, Kader, Kalaminja, Kalinga, Kalo, Kavah, Kavya, Koi, Koya, Manik, Manika, Manike, Manikfan, Naha, Raha, Rana, Tarkan, Thakhan, Thakur, Thakurfan, and Veer.

== See also ==
- Giraavaru people
- Maldivian folklore
- Minicoy
