= List of schools in the Maldives =

List of Primary and Secondary schools in Maldives

This is a list of primary and secondary schools in the South Asian island country of the Maldives. Tertiary schools are included in the separate list of universities and colleges in the Maldives.

== Malé City ==
No.	Island	Name	Grades	Notes
001	Malé	Thaajuddeen School	Preschool – Grade 10	
002	Malé	Iskandhar School	Preschool – Grade 10	
003	Malé	Jamaluddin School	Preschool – Grade 10	
004	Malé	Kalaafaanu School	Preschool – Grade 10	
005	Malé	Al Madharusathul Arabiyyathul Islamiyya (Arabiyya School)	Grades 1–12	Currently the only school in Maldives which actively teaches their students in Arabic.
006	Malé	Aminiya School	Preschool – Grade 10	An all-girls school until the late 1990s.
007	Malé	Majeediyya School	Preschool – Grade 10	Initially an all-boys school.
008	Hulhumalé	Centre for Higher Secondary Education	Grades 11–12	Formerly named the Science Education Centre.
009	Malé	Ghiyasuddin International School	Grades 1–10	
010	Malé	Imaduddin School	Grades 1–10	Formerly the youngest school in Maldives.
011	Malé	Dharumavantha School	Grades 1–10	
012	Malé	Madhrasathul Ameer Ahmed Preschool	Preschool	
013	Malé	Galolhu School	Preschool	
014	Malé	Ahmadhiyya International School	LKG–Grade 12	Formerly named Madharashul Ahmadhiyya. On 2014, it was rebranded to Ahmadhiyya International School.
015	Malé	Maafannu Madharusa	Preschool	
016	Malé	Malé English School	Grades 11–12	
017	Vilimalé	Muhyiddin School	Grades 1–10	
018	Hulhumalé	Ghaazee School	Kindergarten – Grade 12	
019	Hulhumalé	Brightway International School	Preschool – Grade 12	Formerly Lale Youth International School (Private), then Fareedhiyya School (Government), later Gateway International School (Private).
020	Malé	Billabong High International School	Preschool – Grade 12	Formerly named EPS.
021	Malé	Hiriya School	Grades 1–10	
022	Malé	MAPS International High	Grades 11–12	
023	Malé	PL Kids Preschool	Preschool, Kindergarten	The first private indoor preschool in Malé since 2011.
024	Malé	Villa International High School	Grades 11–12	
025	Malé	Living Values Education Preschool	Preschool, Kindergarten	
026	Malé	Izzudheen School	Grades 1–6	One of the youngest schools in the Maldives, being opened in 2020.
027	Hulhumalé	Rehendhi School	Grade 1 – Grade 10	One of the biggest schools in the Maldives. Currently the school with the most students in Hulhumalé.
028	Hulhumalé	Huravee School	Kindergarten – Grade 10	The biggest school in the Maldives as of 2022.
029	Malé	Finland International School	Grades 1–10	
030	Hulhumalé	S'alaah'udhdheen School	Grades 1–9	
031	Hulhumalé	Kaamil Didi Primary School	Grades 1–6	The first school opened in phase two of Hulhumalé.
032	Hulhumalé	Ajial International School	LKG–Grade 3	Plans to expand teaching to A-level.
033	Hulhumalé	Shaheed Ali School	Grades 1-10	

== Upper North Province ==
=== Haa Alif Atoll ===
No.	Island	Name	Grades	Notes
001	Hoarafushi	HA Atholhu Madharusa	Grades 1–12	
002	Dhidhdhoo	HA Atholhu Thauleemee Markaz	Grades 1–12	
003	Utheem	Madhrasathul Sulthan Mohamed Thakurufaanul Auzam	Grades 1–10	
004	Baarah	Baarashu School	Grades 1–10	
005	Ihavandhoo	Ihavandhoo School	Grades 1–12	The biggest school with highest number of students enrollment in Haa Alif Atoll with over 800 students.
006	Maarandhoo	Maarandhoo School	Grades 1–12	
007	Filladhoo	Madharusathul Sobah	Grades 1–10	
008	Thakandoo	Madhrasathul Shaheed Ali Thakurufaan	Grades 1–10	
009	Kelaa	Madhrasathul Sheikh Ibrahim	Grades 1–10	
010	Mulhadhoo	Mulhadhoo School	Grades 1–10	
011	Muraidhoo	Muraidhoo School	Grades 1–10	
012	Thuraakunu	Thuraakunu School	Grades 1–10	
013	Uligamu	Uligamu School	Grades 1–10	
014	Vashafaru	Vashafaru School	Grades 1–10	

=== Haa Dhaalu Atoll ===
No.	Island	Name	Grades	Notes
037	Vaikaradhoo	HDH Atholhu Madharusa	Grades 1–10	
038	Kulhudhuffushi	HdH. Atoll Education Centre	Preschool–Grade 10	
039	Kulhudhuffushi	Jalaluddin School	Grades 1–12	
040	Kulhudhuffushi	Afeefudheen School	Preschool–Grade 10	
041	Finey	Finey School	Grades 1–10	
042	Hanimaadhoo	Hanimaadhoo School	Grades 1–10	
043	Hirimaradhoo	Hirimaradhoo School	Grades 1–10	
044	Kumundhoo	Kumundhoo School	Grades 1–10	
045	Kurin'bee	Kurin'bee School	Grades 1–10	
046	Maavaidhoo	Madharusathul Hussainiyya	Grades 1–7	
047	Makunudhoo	Makunudhoo School	Grades 1–10	
048	Naivaadhoo	Naivaadhoo School	Grades 1–10	
049	Nellaidhoo	Nellaidhoo School	Grades 1–10	
050	Neykurandhoo	Neykarandhoo School	Grades 1–10	
051	Nolhivaram	Nolhivaram School	Grades 1–10	
052	Nolhivaranfaru	Nolhivaranfaru School	Grades 1–10	
053	Kunburudhoo	Kunburudhoo School	Grades 1–10	No longer in use due to the island being uninhabited in 2009-2010

=== Shaviyani Atoll ===
No.	Island	Name	Grades	Notes
001	Komandoo	Sh. Atoll Education Centre	LKG, UKG to Grade 12	
002	Funadhoo	Funadhoo School	LKG, UKG to Grade 12	
003	Milandhoo	Milandhoo School	LKG, UKG to Grade 12	
004	Bileffahi	Bileiyfahi School	LKG, UKG to Grade 10	
005	Feevah	Feevaku School	LKG, UKG to Grade 10	
006	Feydhoo	Feydhoo School	LKG, UKG to Grade 11	
007	Foakaidhoo	Foakaidhoo School	LKG, UKG to Grade 12	
008	Goidhoo	Sh. Goidhoo School	LKG, UKG to Grade 10	
009	Lhaimagu	Lhaimagu School	LKG, UKG to Grade 10	
010	Maaungoodhoo	Maaungoodhoo School	LKG, UKG to Grade 10	
011	Narudhoo	Narudhoo School	LKG, UKG to Grade 10	
012	Noomaraa	Noomaraa School	LKG, UKG to Grade 10	

=== Noonu Atoll ===
No.	Island	Name	Grades	Type
001	Velidhoo	Noonu Atoll Education Centre	LKG to Grade 10	Government
002	Velidhoo	HINZ Pre-school	Playschool to Nursery	Private
003	Manadhoo	Noonu Atoll School	Grades 1–10	Government
004	Holhudhoo	Meyna School	Grades 1–12	Government
005	Kendhi'kulhudhoo	Kendhikulhudhoo School	Grades 1–12	Government
006	Fohdhoo	Fohdhoo School	Grades 1–10	Government
007	Henbadhoo	Hen'badhoo School	Grades 1–10	Government
008	Kudafari	Kudafaree School	Grades LKG to Grade 12	Government
009	Landhoo	Landhoo School	Grades 1–10	Government
010	Lhohi	Lhohee School	Grades 1–10	Government
011	Maafaru	Maafaru School	Grades 1–10	Government
012	Maalhendhoo	Maalhendhoo School	Grades 1–10	Government
013	Magoodhoo	Magoodhoo School	Grades 1–10	Government
014	Miladhoo	Hidhaya School	Grades 1–10	Government

=== Raa Atoll ===
No.	Island	Name	Grades	Type
001	Alifushi	Alifushi School	Grades 1–10	Government
002	Vaadhoo	Vaadhoo School	Grades 1–10	Government
003	Rasgetheemu	Rasgetheemu School	Grades 1–10	Government
004	Angolhitheemu	Angolhitheemu School	Grades Per-School–10	Government
005	Hulhudhuffaaru	Hulhudhuffaaru School	Grades 1–12	Government
006	Un'goofaaru	Ungoofaaru School	Grades 1–10	Government
007	Meedhoo	Raa Atoll Education Center	Grades 1–12	Government
008	Dhuvaafaru	Raa Atoll School	Grades 7–10	Government
009	Dhuvaafaru	Dhuvaafaru Primary School	Grades UKG,LKG & 1–6	Government
010	Maakurathu	Maakurathu School	Grades 1–10	Government
011	Fainu	Fainu School	Grades Pre-school–10	Government
012	Kinolhas	Kinolhahu School	Grades 1–10	Government
013	Inguraidhoo	Inguraidhoo School	Grades 1–10	Government
014	Innamaadhoo	Innamaadhoo School	Grades 1–10	Government
015	Rasmaadhoo	Rasmaadhoo School	Grades Pre-School–10	Government
016	Maduvvaree	Maduvvaree School	Grades 1–10	Government
017	Maduvvaree	M.E.C Nursery Class	Grades NURS, LKG, UKG	Private
018	Meedhoo	Meedhoo Pre-School	Grades NURS, LKG, UKG	Community
019	Alifushi	Alifushee Pre-School	Grades NURS, LKG, UKG	Community
020	Un'goofaaru	Saif Pre-School	Grades NURS, LKG, UKG	Private
021	Rasgetheemu	Koimalaa Pre-School	Grades NURS, LKG, UKG	Private
022	Kinolhas	Kinolhas Pr-School	Grades NURS, LKG, UKG	Private
023	Inguraidhoo	Inguraidhoo Pre-School	Grades NURS, LKG, UKG	Private
024	Hulhudhuffaaru	Huzooru Pr-School	Grades NURS, LKG, UKG	Private
025	Innamaadhoo	Iyaar Pre-School	Grades NURS, LKG, UKG	Private
026	Maakurathu	Maakurathu Pre-School	Grades NURS, LKG, UKG	Private
027	Vaadhoo	Vaadhoo Pre-School	Grades NURS, LKG, UKG	Private
028	Dhuvaafaru	Tiny Star Pre-school	Grades NURS,	Private

=== Baa Atoll ===
No.	Island	Name	Grades	Type
001	Eydhafushi	Baa Atoll Education Centre	Grades 1–10	Government
002	Kudarikilu	Kudarikilu School	LKG, UKG to Grade 10	Government
003	Kendhoo	Kendhoo School	Grades 1–10	Government
004	Kamadhoo	Kamadhoo School	LKG to Grade 10	Government
005	Kihaadhoo	Kihaadhoo School	Grades 1–12	Government
006	Dhonfanu	Dhonfanu School	LKG to Grade 10	Government
007	Dharavandhoo	Baa Atoll School	LKG, UKG to Grade 10	Government
008	Maalhos	Maalolhu School	LKG, UKG to Grade 10	Government
009	Hithadhoo	Hithadhoo School	LKG, UKG to Grade 10	Government
010	Thulhaadhoo	Thulhaadhoo School		Government
011	Goidhoo	Goidhoo School	Grades 1–12	Government
012	Fehendhoo	Fehendhoo School		Government
013	Fulhadhoo	Fulhadhoo School	Grades 1–9	Government

=== Lhaviyani ===
- Madhrasathul Ifthithaah(Lh. Naifaru)
- Lh.Atoll School(Lh. Kurendhoo)
- Habashee Pre-School(Lh. Kurendhoo)
- Lh. Olhuvelifushi School(Lh. Olhuvelifushi)

== Central region ==
=== Faafu Atoll ===
- Faafu Atholhu Madharusa (Feeali)
- Magoodhoo School (Magoodhoo)
- Dharanboodhoo School (Dharanboodhoo)
- Bilehdhoo School (Bilehdhoo)
- Faafu Atoll Education Center (Nilandhoo)

== Southern region ==
=== Gnaviyani Atoll ===
No.	Island	Name	Grades	Notes
001	Fuvahmulah	GN. Atoll Education Centre	Grades 1–12	
002	Fuvahmulah	Mohamed Jamaluddin School		
003	Fuvahmulah	Hafiz Ahmed School	LKG, UKG to Grade 10	
004	Fuvahmulah	Fuvamulaku School	LKG, UKG to Grade 10	
005	Fuvahmulah	Ideal School	pre-nursery to LKG, UKG	
006	Fuvahmulah	Zikura School	LKG, UKG to Grade 7	Used to be named "Zikura Pre-School"
007	Fuvahmulah	Brightway International School	Pre-Nursery to Grade 6	

=== Gaafu Dhaalu Atoll ===
- Gaafu Dhaalu Atoll Education Centre (Thinadhoo, Gaafu Dhaalu Atoll)
- Thinadhoo School
- Aboobakuru School
- Madaveli School
- Hoandeddhoo School
- Nadellaa School
- Rathafandhoo School
- Vaadhoo Jamaaluddin School
- Huvadhoo School (FaresMathoda)
- Fiyoaree School
- Raw'la Preschool
- Kangaroo Preschool / Gdh.Thinadhoo

=== Addu City ===
- Seenu Atoll School (Hulhumeedhoo)
- Sharafuddin School (Hithadhoo)
- Irshadiyya School (Maradhoo)
- Shamsudheen School (Hulhumeedhoo) [Defunct, Merged with Seenu Atoll School]
- Hulhudhoo School (Hulhumeedhoo) [Defunct, Merged with Seenu Atoll School]
- Feydhoo School (Feydhoo)
- Nooraanee School (Hithadhoo)
- Addu High School (Hithadhoo)
- Maradhoo school (Maradhoo)
- Shareefee Pre school (Hulhumeedhoo)
- Makthabul Asriyya (Hulhumeedhoo)
- Addu Atoll Education Center (Hithadhoo)
- Maradoofeydhoo School (Maradhoofeydhooo)
- Hithadhoo School (Hithadhoo)
- Kudhimaa Pre School (Feydhoo)
- Aman pre-school (Maradhoo)
- Ujala pre-school (Maradhoofeydhooo)
- Medhevalu School (Hithadhoo)
- Hiraa School (Hithadhoo)
- Kangaroo husainiyya pre school
- Mianz international school

=== Thaa Atoll ===
- Kinbidhoo School

Thaa Atholhu Thauleemee Marukaz

== See also ==
- Education in the Maldives
- Lists of schools
