= Education in the Maldives =

Historically in Maldives the children aged three and up in the Maldives were educated in traditional schools known as "Kiyavaage" or "Edhurge", generally using a single large room or the shelter of tree. The children learned simple arithmetic, Dhivehi and some Arabic, and practised reciting the Qur'an. These private schools no longer exist, as western style schools replaced them in the 1980s–1990s.

The first western-style school in the Maldives is Majeediyya School, a secondary established in 1927. The school was originally co-educational, but it was felt necessary to create a second school for girls (Aminiya School) in 1944.

Based on a study by educational advisors from UNESCO, the Government of Maldives began implementation of the Educational Development Project on 6 October 1976. This Project constituted a comprehensive programme of educational development comprising Expansion of Primary Education, Teacher Training, Curriculum Development, Educational Radio, Community Education Programme for Adult Education and Textbook Development and Printing. The first school under this project was opened in Baa Atoll Eydhafushi in March 1978 followed by another two in N. Manadhoo and HDh. Kulhudhuffushi in March 1979. School construction was continued in all atolls and was later complemented by Primary Schools construction project by Japan. Curriculum Development began in 1976, while Teacher Training began in 1977. Simultaneously, other programmes were introduced and continued through the 1970s and until the mid-1980s from where on the First Ten Year Master Plan for Educational (1986–1995) began implementation. Second Master Plan was implemented 1996–2005. These were the bases of educational development in the Maldives begun by the government of President Nasir continued by President Gayoom.

As of 2002, the President's Office claimed that universal primary education has almost been achieved and the literacy rate had improved from 70 per cent in 1978 to 98.82 per cent. In 2005, there were 106,220 students in schools, or 40% of the total population.

== Higher education ==
A National University Act was passed in January 2011 to establish the first university in the Maldives. Institutions offering higher education in the Maldives are:

- Maldives National University, which was previously known as the Maldives College of Higher Education. The college had offered 95% of the post-secondary education in the Maldives
- Cyryx College
- Mandhu College, which provides tertiary education to lower and higher secondary school leavers.
- Villa College , which has offered degree courses in computing and IT since 2007.
- MAPS College
- Ixcel Centre for Professional Studies
- Avid College
- Maldives Business School
- Maldives Polytechnic
- Islamic University of Maldives
- Clique College

== See also ==
- List of schools in the Maldives
- List of universities and colleges in Asia
