= Centre for Higher Secondary Education =

- Centre for Higher Secondary Education Malé
- Centre for Higher Secondary Education Hulhumalé
