= Vaadhoo =

Vaadhoo as a place name may refer to:

- Vaadhoo (Gaafu Dhaalu Atoll), Republic of Maldives
- Vaadhoo (Kaafu Atoll), Republic of Maldives
- Vaadhoo (Raa Atoll), Republic of Maldives
