= Komandoo =

Komandoo may refer to the following places in the Maldives:

- Komandoo (Lhaviyani Atoll)
- Komandoo (Shaviyani Atoll)
