= CHSE =

CHSE may refer to:

- Centre for Higher Secondary Education - A school in Male', Maldives.
- Council of Higher Secondary Education, Orissa
- West Bengal Council of Higher Secondary Education

== See also ==
- COHSE
