= James Horsburgh =

Scottish hydrographer

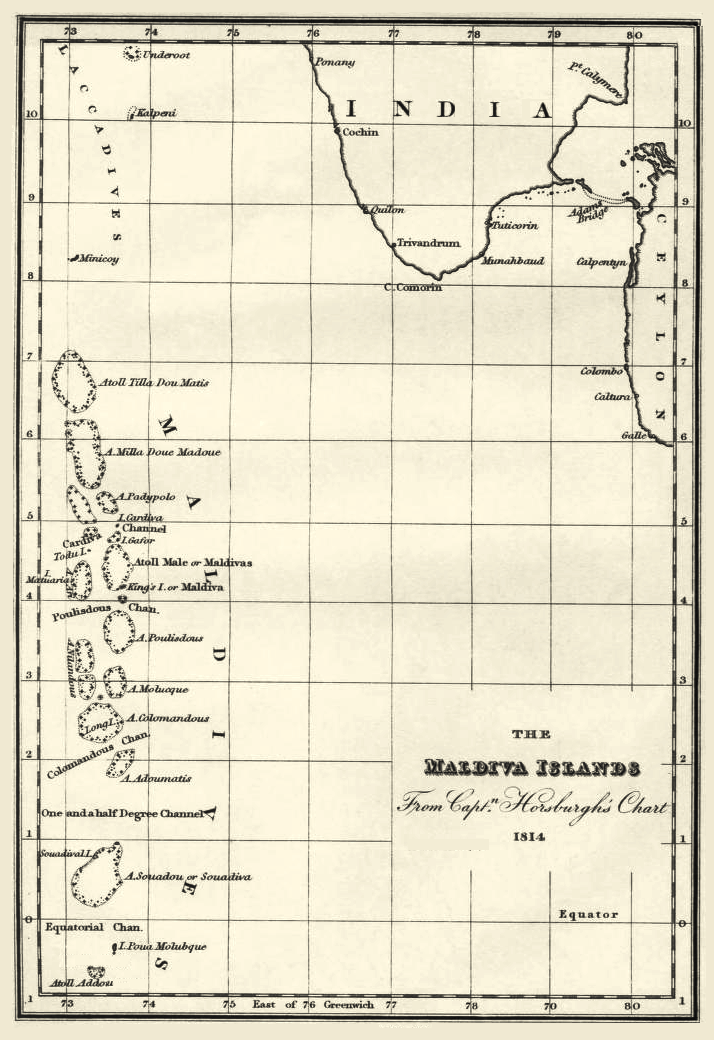
1814 map of 'The Maldiva Islands' by Captain James Horsburgh

James Horsburgh F.R.S (23 September 1762 – 14 May 1836) was a Scottish hydrographer. He worked for the British East India Company, (EIC) and mapped many seaways in the Indian Ocean, the Malay Archipelago, and China in the late 18th century and early 19th century. He is best-known for the India Directory, a set of sailing directions that became a standard work for over half a century.

== Life ==
James Horsburgh was born at Elie in Fife. His parents were poor, but were able to secure him an education at a local school, and he learned the basics of mathematics, book-keeping and navigation theory. He was apprenticed to Messrs. Wood, merchants of Elie. He went to sea at the age of 16 sailing from Newcastle to Hamburg, Holland, and Ostend, mainly in the coal trade. In May 1770 his ship was captured by the French, and he was imprisoned at Dunkirk. After his release, he made voyages to the West Indies and Calcutta. On 30 May 1786, on board the EIC ship Atlas sailing from Batavia to Ceylon he was shipwrecked on the island of Diego Garcia. This disaster influenced him in his decision to devote himself to producing accurate charts and improving navigation skills.

After his rescue from the shipwreck on Diego Garcia, he travelled to Bombay, and joined the crew of the Gunjanwar in which he became first mate. He spent the next ten years in several large ships trading between Bombay, Bengal and China. In 1791 he joined the Anna. During two voyages to China he taught himself drawing, etching and sperics, and made many observations which enabled him to construct three charts—of the Strait of Macassar; of the western part of the Philippines; and of the track from Dampier Strait, through Pitt Passage, to Batavia. These charts were forwarded to Alexander Dalrymple, hydrographer to the EIC, who published them for the use of the Company's ships. Horsburgh received a letter of thanks, and a sum of money for the purchase of nautical instruments.

In 1796 he arrived back in England as first mate of the Carron and met Dalrymple who introduced him to a number of eminent scientists including Sir Joseph Banks and Nevil Maskelyne. He then sailed to the West Indies in Carron, there transporting troops to Puerto Rico and Trinidad. In 1798 he took command of the Anna, the ship in which he had previously been first mate, sailing to China, Bengal, and Madras, as well as twice to England. During these voyages he continued to make frequent observations. When in Bombay, he purchased the astronomical clock which had been made for the expedition in search of La Pérouse. This clock, made by Berthoud had an excellent composition pendulum, and Horsburgh set it up in Bommbay and Canton for chronometer rating and for observations of the eclipses of the satellites of Jupiter. From April 1802 to February 1804 he recorded barometric pressure every four hours. This led to the discovery of a diurnal rise and fall of atmospeheric pressure in the open ocean, which was much less apparent near to the land. These results were published in the Philosophical Transactions in 1805. In that year Horsburgh sailed to England on the Cirencester. On this voyage his companion was Captain Peter Heywood of the Royal Navy, an experienced surveyor who subsequently assisted him in preparing his works for publication.

In March, 1806 Horsburgh was elected a Fellow of the Royal Society. His proposers were A B Lambert, H Cavendish, A Dalrymple, Wm Marsden, Nevil Maskelyne and M Garthshore. In 1808, he published the India Directory, Or, Directions for Sailing to and from the East Indies, China, New Holland, Cape of Good Hope, Brazil, and the Interjacent Ports. This work, as comprehensive as its title suggests, was compiled partly from his own observations and charts, made over 21 years of navigating in those waters, and partly from collating and summarising the journals and reports of other navigators held by the EIC. It became a standard work for navigation for over half a century, going through numerous editions, the last being the eighth in 1864.

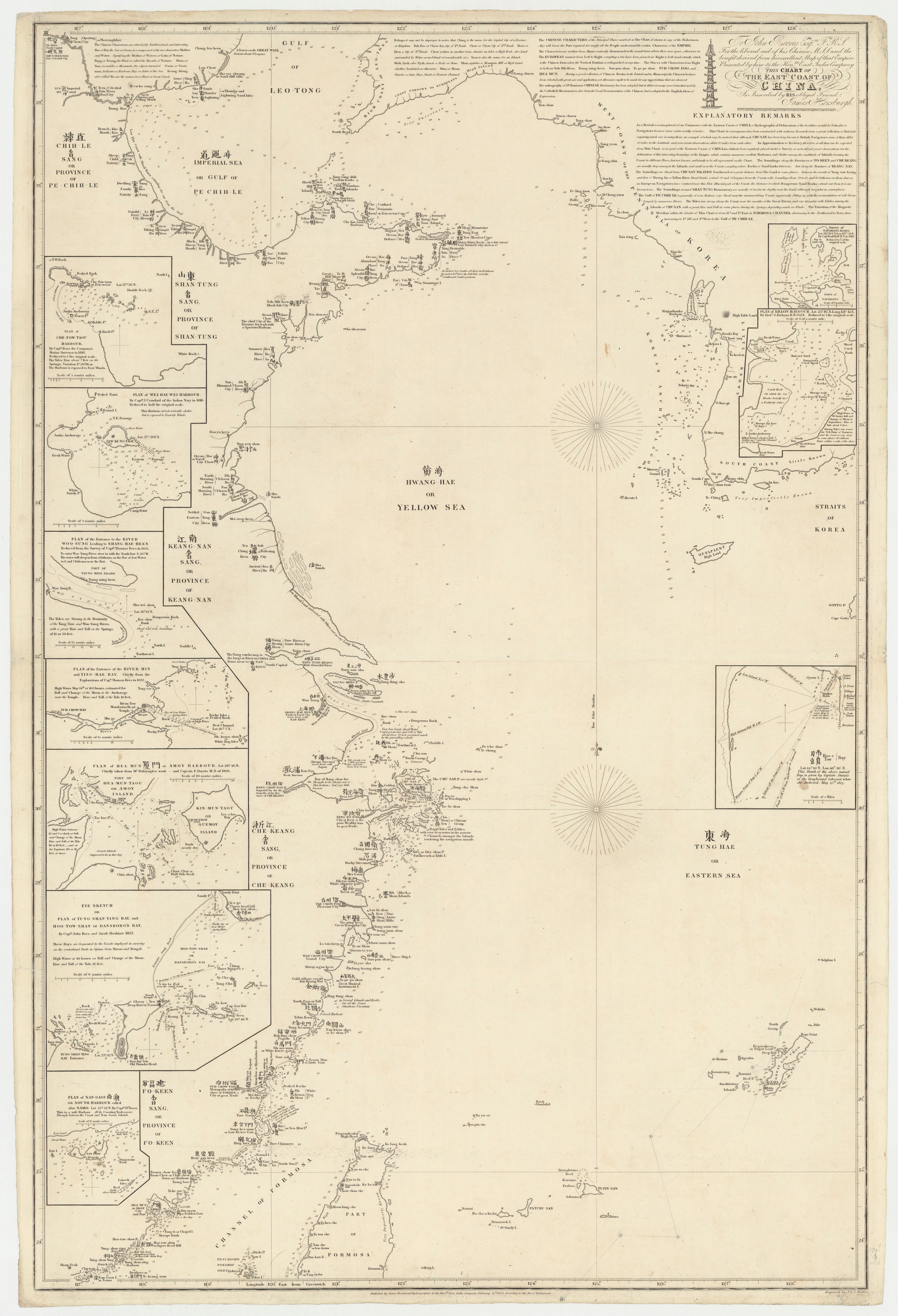
Chart of the East Coast of China, the last chart published by Horsburgh, with names in Chinese and English

Alexander Dalrymple died in 1808. Two years later, Horsbrurgh was appointed as his successor in the post of hydrographer to the EIC. As hydrographer, he published many new charts. In 1816 he published Atmospheric Register for indicating storms at sea. In 1819 he published a revised and extended edition of Murdoch Mackenzie's Treatise on Marine Surveying. He died in May 1836, aged 74 years.

== Legacy ==
Robert Moresby, during his survey of the Maldives in 1834, named a small atoll south of Southern Maalhosmadulhu Atoll after James Horsburgh as a homage to his valuable previous hydrographic work.

Horsburgh Island in the Cocos (Keeling) Islands is also named after him as is the Horsburgh Lighthouse, located on Pedra Branca, Singapore, the construction of which was funded by a group of British merchants in Canton, China (now Guangzhou).

Horsburgh was the first to document the island now known as Spratly Island, naming it Storm Island. However, Richard Spratly's sighting eventually become better known and led to the naming of the entire region as the Spratly Islands.

== See also ==
- Atolls of the Maldives
- Alexander Dalrymple, 1st Hydrographer of the Navy
- Fehendu / Fulhadu
- Horsburgh Atoll
- Robert Moresby
