= Noomaraa =

Noomaraa ނޫމަރާ
- Inhabited island
- Location in Maldives
- Coordinates: 06°26′01″N 73°04′02″E
- Country: Maldives
- Geographic atoll: Miladhummadulhu Atoll
- Administrative atoll: Shaviyani Atoll
- Distance to Malé: 254.49 km (158.13 mi)

Dimensions
  - Length: 0.900 km (0.559 mi)
  - Width: 0.480 km (0.298 mi)

Population (2022)
  - Total: 371
- Time zone: UTC+05:00 (MST)

Noomaraa (Dhivehi: ނޫމަރާ) is one of the inhabited islands of the Shaviyani Atoll administrative division, and geographically part of the North Miladhummadulhu Atoll in the Maldives. The Island code is C2.

== History ==
Noomaraa is a typical island in Maldives. The first settlers of the island were a mystery to historians. It is believed that they are early Maldivian settlers dating back to 5th century BC with the Aryan immigrants coming from neighboring countries India and Sri Lanka. The island had maintained its uniqueness like that of many other islands in the Maldives; its culture, traditions, language and religion had been as of any other island in Maldives.

In Maldivian History, little has been written about Noomaraa. One of the available books was written by Maldives prominent historian Mr.Mohamed Ibrahim Luthufy in his famous history book "Dhivehi Raajjeyge Geographyge Vanavaru" (The Geographical Atlas of Maldives), in which he mentioned about the physical of the people of Noomaraa.

== Geography ==
The island is 254.49 km (158 mi; 137 nmi) north of the country's capital, Malé. It is located at the eastern tip of Shaviyani Atoll, 40 kilometres (25 mi) from the atoll's capital of Funadhoo. The area of Noomaraa is 41.3 hectares (102 acres). The length of the island is 900 metres (3,000 ft), and the width is 480 metres (1,570 ft).

=== Environment ===
Extensive soil erosion has occurred on the northeast and northwest sides of Noomaraa.

== Demography ==
It is the least popululous island in the atoll. According to the Secretariat of Noomaraa Council, the population of Noomaraa in 2012 was 487 people: 244 males and 243 females.

Historical population
Year	Pop.	±%
2006	412	—
2014	337	−18.2%
2022	371	+10.1%
2006-2014-2022: Census populations Source:

== Economy ==
Fishing is the backbone of the economy of Noomaraa, with most fishing done by pole and line. The government-owned Maldives Industrial Fisheries Company also operates in the region. Fish sought include tuna of the "Latti" and "Raagondi" kinds. These tuna are boiled and dried in the sun, then sold to buyers in Male. Locally caught fish are also used to make rihaakuru, a traditional fish soup. During the past years, fish catch has increased rapidly.

== Education ==
In 1986, a school called "Noomaraa Makthab" opened on the island. In 1991, it moved to new premises and changed its name to "Noomaraa School". In 2005, it became a government school. In that year, secondary education began, with only business streams. The school had an enrollment of 95 in 2012.

The island also has a preschool, which is managed by the Association for Noomaraa Development (AND). It has an enrollment of 35 students.

== Transport ==
=== Harbour ===
An area of 45,000 square feet (4,200 m^{2}) in the island's harbour was dredged in 2012. The harbour is not entirely sheltered from rough weather: in windy conditions, fishermen have difficulty using it, and must stay awake nights safeguarding their boats.

== Other statistics ==
Island Code: C2

Area: 41.3 hectares

Economic Activities: fishing, Carpenter,

Shops (Private): 05

Fast Foods/Tea Shops: 02

Pharmacy: 01

Island School: Govt. Owned 1

Highest Grade 10

Preschool: Private Owned 1

Health Center: Govt 1

Nurses: 03

Doctors: 01

Mid Wives: 1

Number of Boundary Marked House Plots: 110

Number of Houses Boundary NOT Marked: 20

Fully Built Households: 74

Household NOT Fully Built: 36

Mosques (Ladies): 01

Mosques (Gents): 01

Bicycle: 100 Pvt (estimated)

Mechanised Dhoni 06

Sathari Dhoni: 02

Vadhu Dhoni : 16

Bokkuraa: 06

Rain Water Tanks: 74

Number of Houses with Toilets: 74
