= Shaviyani Atoll =

Coordinates: 6°14′N 73°06′E

- atoll of the Maldives
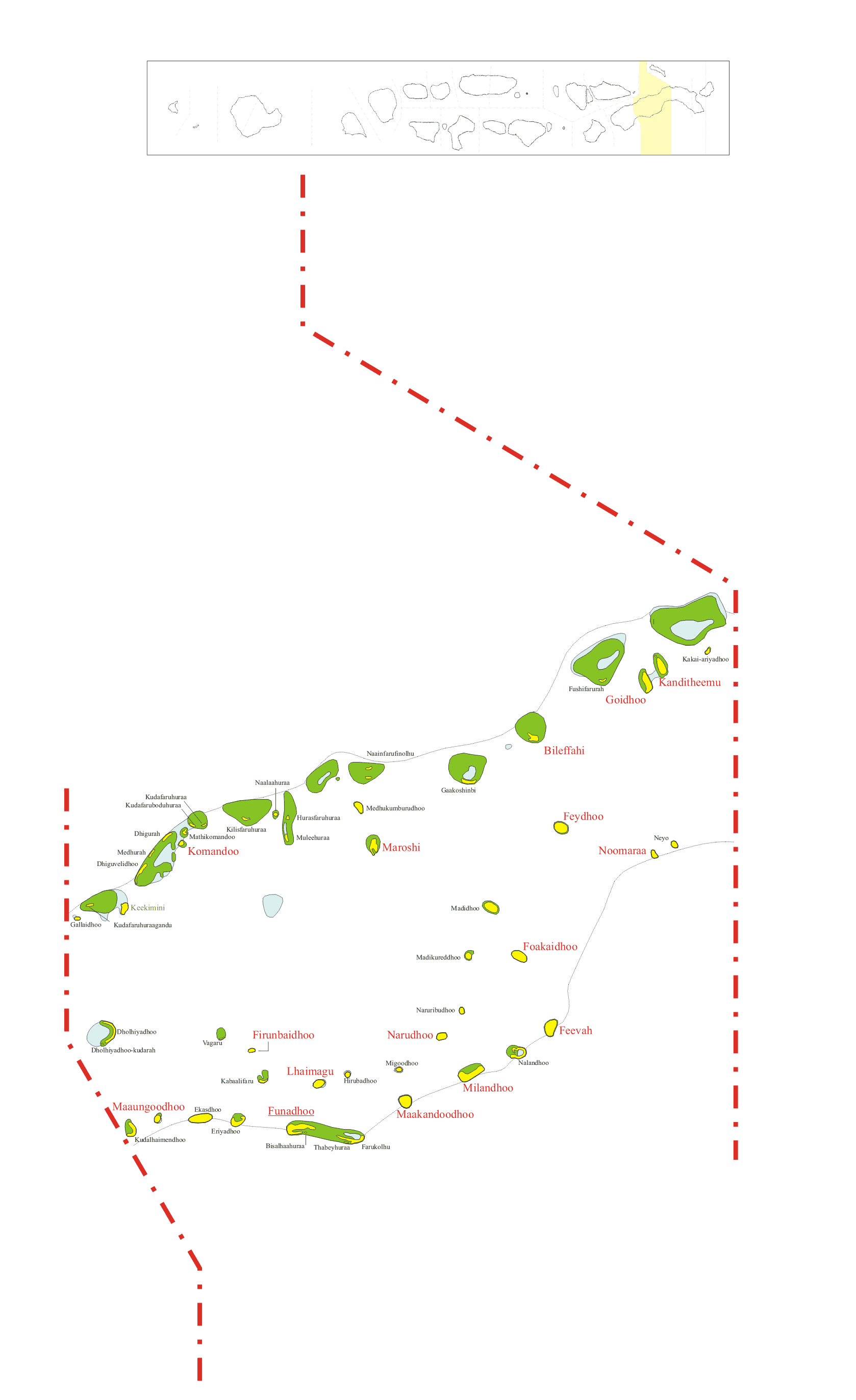

- Location of Shaviyani in Maldives
- Country: Maldives
- Corresponding geographic atoll(s): Miladhunmadulu Uthuruburi
- Location: 6°30' N and 5°58' N
- Capital: Funadhoo

Population
  - Total: 12,091 noofislands=51
- Letter code: C
- Dhivehi letter code: Sh (ށ)
  - Inhabited islands: Bileffahi * Feevah * Feydhoo * Foakaidhoo * Funadhoo * Goidhoo * Kanditheemu * Komandoo * Lhaimagu * Maaungoodhoo * Maroshi * Milandhoo * Narudhoo * Noomaraa
  - Uninhabited islands: Bis Huraa, Dhigu Rah, Dhiguvelldhoo, Dholhiyadhoo, Dholhiyadhoo Kudarah, Dhonveli-huraa, Ekasdhoo, Eriyadhoo, Farukolhu, Fushifarurah, Gaakoshinbi, Gallaidhoo, Hirubadhoo, Hurasfaruhuraa, Kabaalifaru, Keekimini, Killissafaruhuraa, Kudalhaimendhoo, Madidhoo, Madikurendhdhoo, Mathikomandoo, Medhurah, Medhukunburudhoo, Migoodhoo, Naainfarufinolhu, Nalandhoo, Naruibudhoo, Neyo, Vagaru, Firubaidhoo, Maakadhoodhoo
- Resort islands(*), airports(¤) and industrial islands are also considered uninhabited.

Shaviyani Atoll, which is known by its abbreviated name (also known as Northern Miladhunmadulu Atoll or Miladhunmadulu Uthuruburi), is an administrative division of the Maldives. It corresponds to the northern section of the natural Miladhunmadulu Atoll, located in the north of the Maldives.

== History ==
=== Capital island dispute ===
On 26 October 2009, the government decided to move the capital of Shaviyani Atoll from Funadhoo to Milandhoo, citing more ease for the people. However, this decision was overruled by parliament in June 2010, and Funadhoo was reinstated as the capital of the atoll, much to the dismay of both the government and the people of Milandhoo. This decision was vetoed by President Nasheed, and Milandhoo continued as the seat of the atoll office. The issue surfaced once again on February 26, 2011, when home rule was introduced into the country and the atoll offices were to be rebranded as the secretariats for the newly formed atoll councils. According to the Decentralization Bill, under which the councils were formed, the respective secretariats were to be seated in the capital islands of each atoll as stipulated in the new constitution of 2008, which in Shaviyani Atoll's case is Funadhoo. In the first atoll council meeting, it was decided to move the secretariat from Milandhoo to Funadhoo, as per the law states. The government responded with threats to dissolve the council if the move is followed through, and appealed the order of the Funadhoo Magistrate Court to carry out the move. On March 1, after the Milandhoo Magistrate Court ordered the work of the secretariat to return to Milandhoo, an order backed by the President, riot police was deployed to Funadhoo to "urge the council to respect the court order" issued by Milandhoo. The following day, the Supreme Court of the Maldives ruled that the Milandhoo court order was invalid and that the Funadhoo court order was, a ruling which the government and Milandhoo did not accept. On April 6, the parliament overrode the initial presidential veto on the capital island legislature, and declared Funadhoo as the legitimate capital island. In 2012, all of the materials used in Milandhoo were transferred to Funadhoo.

It is notable that as of 2013, the official website of the President's Office does not display an address for the Shaviyani Atoll Council.

== Geography ==
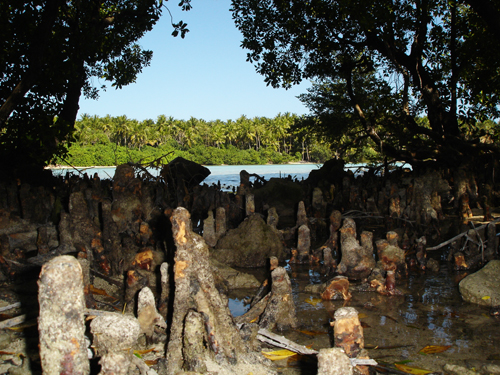
The mangrove swamps on the island of Maroshi in Shaviyani Atoll. Historically it was the site where Bodu Thakurufaanu concealed the ship Kalhuoffummi at night, while fighting against the Portuguese

This administrative atoll is 37 miles long, it is the third atoll from the northern edge of the country, and It comprises 51 islands of which 16 are inhabited. The islands in this atoll are small with half of the islands having less than 20 hectares (49.4 acres) of land area. There are 9 islands that are smaller than one hectare (2.49 acres). These islands comprise 18% of the islands. The smallness of the atoll indicates to the islands' vulnerability to environmental impacts.

== Population ==
The population of the atoll is 12,091 as of the 2014 census.

== Economy ==
Fishing and agriculture form the mainstay of the atoll's economy. Fishing is engaged in throughout the year, with pole, line and reef fishing practised in various islands in the atoll. The atoll is also known for craftsmanship, such as mat and rope weaving.

Several inhabitants work in the tourism industry and other commercial trades in the Maldivian capital, Malé. The biggest employer in Shaviyani Atoll's tourism sector is Sirru Fen Fushi.

== Administration ==
The atoll is assigned the Maldivian letter 'Shaviyani' and the Latin letter 'C' as the atoll code. The atoll Council is responsible for public services, development and economic affairs. The Shaviyani Atoll Office was established on 9 September 1958 by the state. Until 1 January 1968, the atoll office was located in Lhaimagu which was the capital of the atoll. The government declared that effective from 1 January 1968, the capital would be Farukolhu Funadhoo (Funadhoo) and hence, the atoll office was transferred to Funadhoo.

== Health ==
Basic medical care was introduced in the atoll with the establishment of a health centre on 25 December 1970 in the island of Lhaimagu. This health centre was shifted to Farukolhu Funadhoo (now Funadhoo) in 1971 when the island was made the atoll capital. This health centre is now developed to Atoll Hospital which has a well equipped laboratory and operation theater facilities and are staffed by a gynecologist, anesthetist and a general practitioner. Other than Atoll Hospital, there are 13 health centres in the atoll with doctors and nurses.

Majority of the population of the atoll have access to safe drinking water. Around 99% of the households have been provided with water storage tanks on tsunami recovery program. Most households have safe sanitation facilities.

== Education ==
Primary education is universal in all inhabited islands of Shaviyani Atoll. All the schools in the atoll providing education to Grade 10. And the Atoll Education Centre, Atoll School provide education to Grade 12. Most of the secondary schools yet offer only commerce stream subjects. The schools which offer both the Science and Commerce stream subjects are the Shaviyani Atoll Education Centre in Komandoo, Atoll School in Kanditheemu, Funadhoo School and Milandhoo School. Some of the School introduce TVET programs to the students. Most schools have computer labs funded jointly by parents, government and the Shaviyani Atoll Development Project.
