= Funadhoo (Shaviyani Atoll) =

Funadhoo ފުނަދޫ
- Inhabited island
- Location in Maldives
- Coordinates: 6°8′53.7″N 73°17′24.07″E
- Country: Maldives
- Geographic atoll: Miladhummadulhu Atoll
- Administrative atoll: Shaviyani Atoll
- Distance to Malé: 219.52 km (136.40 mi)

Government
  - Body: Funadhoo Council
  - President: Ahmed Ibrahim Fulhu (IND)

Dimensions
  - Length: 2.350 km (1.460 mi)
  - Width: 0.450 km (0.280 mi)

Population (2022)
  - Total: 2,255
- Time zone: UTC+05:00 (MST)

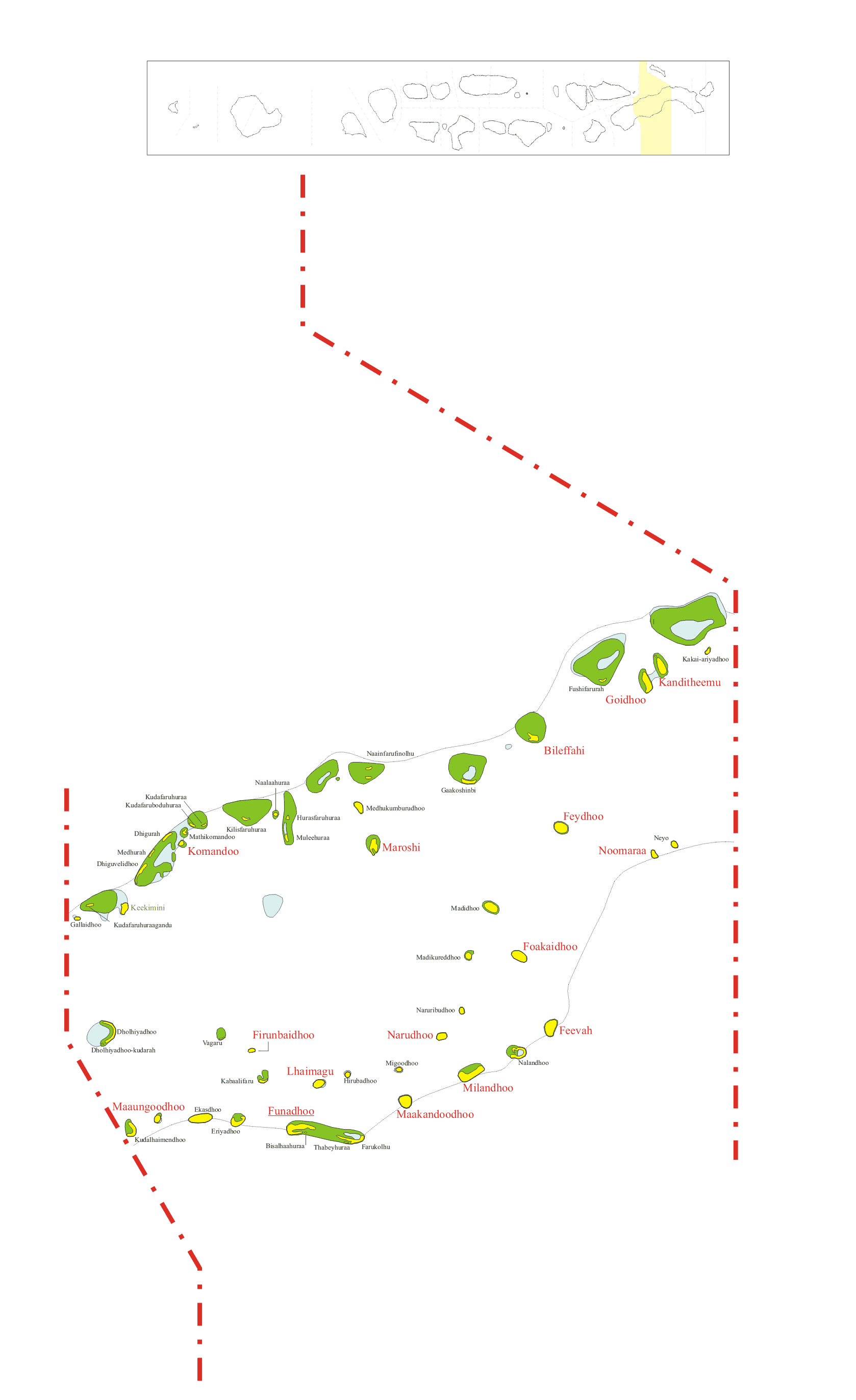
Shaviyani Atoll.

Funadhoo (Dhivehi: ފުނަދޫ) is one of the inhabited islands of the Shaviyani Atoll administrative division and geographically part of the Miladhummadulhu Atoll in the Maldives. Funadhoo is a very common Maldivian place name and is derived from the Dhivehi name for the tree Calophyllum inophyllum (or Funa) which grows on the shores of some islands. It is the administrative capital of Shaviyani Atoll.

== History ==
=== Overview ===
Sh.Funadhoo is the capital island of the Shaviyani atoll. The Shaviyani Atoll Office was established on 9 September 1958 by the state. Until 1 January 1968, the atoll office was located in Lhaimagu which was the capital of the atoll. The government declared that effective from 1 January 1968, the capital would be Farukolhu Funadhoo (Funadhoo) and hence, the atoll office was transferred to Funadhoo.

=== Migration ===
Under the policy to integrate population and development, the first phase of the project to relocate people from Firubaidhoo to Funadhoo was launched on 6 June 1996. The 26 houses planned for this phase were completed and handed over to their owners on the 1 December 1997.

== Geography ==
Funadhoo Island is located on the eastern rim of Miladhummadulhu Atoll at approximately 73°17'23.27"E and 6° 8'58.73"N". The island is located approximately 218 km from Capital Malé and has a domestic airport. Funadhoo is among the largest inhabited islands in Northern Maldives. The nearest island is Farukolhu Island located within the same lagoon about 1100m to the north. The nearest inhabited island is Lhaimagu Island located at 3.80 km. The nearest resort is JW Marriott Maldives Resort & Spa in Vagaru Island (11.2 km).

Funadhoo is a fairly large island with a length of 3000m and a width of 585 m at its widest point. The total surface area of the island is 84.5 Ha (0.85 km2). This island appears to be a relatively stable and constantly growing island. During the last 50 years the island has grown in size including the natural merging of a separate island north of the Funadhoo. Islands coastal environment features a strip of vegetated land close to the coastline followed by a lagoon area between the main island.

The lagoon area [locally known as Dhahfalhu] has become a mangrove habitat over the years. Dhahfalhu's southern part is locally known as Gabaa Kulhi, this part is mostly made of muddy clay, and its home for various wild life; including Mud crab, Truncated Mangrove Snail, Hermit crab, Mangrove crab, Grey heron, Great egret & many other migratory birds.

Northern side of island also has a lake "Goni" which was formed after Funadhoo mainland merged with another island north of the Funadhoo. It was a freshwater lake until 2004 Tsunami, now it is a home for Tilapia, Mangrove crab and wetland birds.

== Health ==
Basic medical care was introduced for the first time in the atoll with the establishment of a health centre on 25 December 1970 in the island of Lhaimagu . This health centre was shifted to Farukolhu Funadhoo (now Funadhoo ) in 1971 when the island was made the atoll capital. This health centre is now developed to Atoll Hospital which has a well-equipped laboratory, X-ray and operation theatre facilities and are staffed by a gynecologist, anesthetist, pediatrician, orthopaedist, dentist, radiologist, general surgeon, and a general practitioner.

== Transport ==
Maldivian (airline) has commenced scheduled direct flights to Funadhoo Airport on 3 February 2020.

There is a well-established sea transport mechanism between Male and Funadhoo. This includes daily speed ferry service & Cargo-passenger ferry services from Funadhoo to Malé and from Malé to Funadhoo. There are more than 3 speed ferry service providers in the area. One-way trip takes around 4 to 5 hours and price ranges between MVR 600-750 per head. There are 5 Cargo-passenger ferry boats which transit Funadhoo harbor, unlike speed ferry service, these ferries are slow, one-way journey takes around 10 hours & price ranges between MVR 250-350 per head.

On the other hand, Funadhoo is connected to the northern business hub Kulhudhuffushi via cargo-passenger ferries operated by MTCC. These ferries also operate around the atoll connecting people to atolls capital Funadhoo.

The first test flight to the regional airport developed in Shaviyani Funadhoo landed on 24 January 2020. National carrier Maldivian, on 3 February 2020, successfully landed first schedule flight at the domestic airport in Funadhoo, Shaviyani Atoll at 8:13 am. Operations will first see three flights to the airport per week, which will be increased to three per day by the end of March.

== Demography ==
Historical population
Year	Pop.	±%
2006	1,599	—
2014	2,019	+26.3%
2022	2,255	+11.7%
2006-2014: Census populations Source:
