= Cyryx College =

Private college in Malé City, Maldives

Coordinates: 4.177278°N 73.509044°E

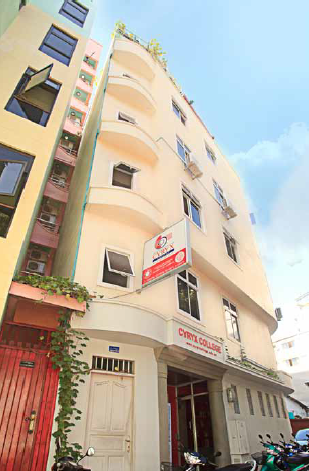
- Type: Private College
- Established: August 24, 1993; 32 years ago
- Affiliations: Help University of Malaysia
- Academic staff: 65
- Students: 1500
- Location: Malé City, Maldives
- Campus: 3

Cyryx College is a private college in Malé City, Maldives. Cyryx College has been in operation since 1993. Cyryx College is the longest serving private college in the Maldives, with the most Maldives Qualification Authority (MQA) certified courses in the education sector.

== History ==
Cyryx College began on 24 August 1993. Starting with 4 computers and 6 students, Cyryx currently caters to over 1,500 students and employs over 65 academic and support staff members. Cyryx College offers certificates, diplomas, and degrees in Information Technology, Management, and Multimedia.

== Facilities ==
Cyryx College operates 3 campuses: the Maafannu campus houses the School of Information Technology, the Machangolhi campus houses the School of Business, and the Galolhu campus houses the School of Multimedia Arts and Design.

== Schools and campuses ==
=== School of Business ===
The School of Business is located at Machangoalhi campus on Kenery Magu. It offers the following programmes:

School of Business Programmes
Postgraduate Programmes
Master's in Business Administration (MBA) 1 year
Master's in Business Administration (MBA) 2 years
Undergraduate Programmes
Bachelor of Business (HRM) Hons (Awarded By HELP University, Malaysia)
Bachelor of Business - Human Resources
Bachelor of Business - Marketing
Bachelor of Business - Finance
Associate Degree in Business
Diploma Programmes
Diploma in Business Administration (2 years)
Diploma in Human Resource Management (2 years)
Diploma in Business Management (1 year)
Diploma in Entrepreneurship & Management (1 year)
Diploma in Accounting & Finance (1 year)
Certificate Programmes
Certificate IV in Business Administration
Certificate III in Food & Beverage Service
Certificate III in Retail & Sales Management
Certificate III in Logistics & Supply Chain Management
Certificate III in E-Marketing Techniques
Certificate III in Accounting & Office Management
Certificate III in Office Management & Administration
Certificate III in Marketing Management
Certificate III in Tourism & Hospitality Management
Certificate III in Human Resource Management
Certificate II in Office Management &Administration
Certificate I in Office Management & Administration

=== School of Information Technology ===
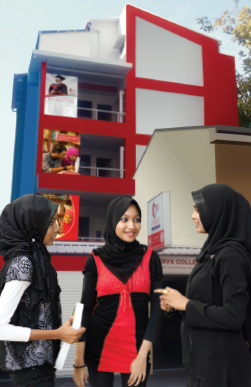
School of IT, Konthanmaage

The School of Information Technology is located at Maafannu campus (M. Kothanmaage, Maaveyo Magu). It offers the following programmes:

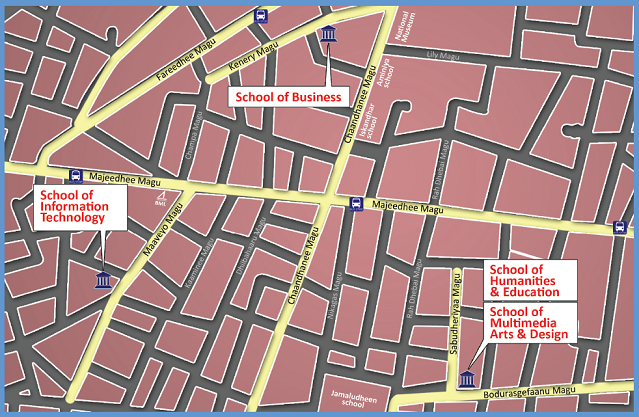
Campus Map

School of Information Technology Programmes
Undergraduate Programmes
Bachelor of Information Technology (Hons)(Awarded By HELP University, Malaysia)
Bachelor of Information Technology (Software Design and Development)
Bachelor of Information Technology (Web programming)
Bachelor of Information Technology (Database Administration)
Bachelor of Information Technology (System Administration)
Associate Degree in Information Technology
Diploma Programmes
Diploma in Information Technology (2 Years)
Diploma in Information Technology (1 Year)
Diploma in Hardware and Network Administration (1 Year)
Certificate Programmes
Certificate IV in Information Technology
Certificate IV in Hardware and Network Administration
Certificate III in Information Technology
Certificate III in N+ Networking
Certificate III in Customer Support and Service Engineer
Certificate II in Information Technology
Certificate I in Information Technology

=== School of Multimedia Arts & Design ===
The School of Multimedia Arts & Design is located at the Galolhu Campus on Bodurasgefaanu Magu. It offers the following programmes:

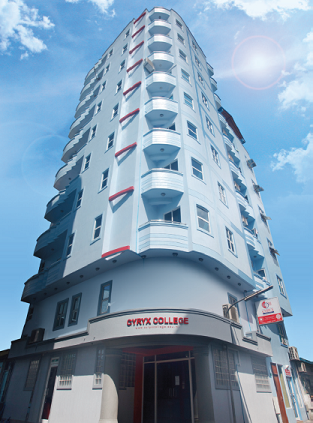
Light Sky Campus

School of Multimedia Programmes
Diploma Programmes
Diploma in 3D Modeling & Animation
Diploma in Editing & Visual Effects
Diploma in Game Design & Development
Diploma in Web Art & Technologies
Diploma in 3D Animation
Diploma in Web Technologies
Diploma in Visual Effects
Certificate Programmes
Certificate IV in Editing & Compositing
Certificate IV in Web Graphics
Certificate IV in Game Modeling
Certificate III in Digital Animation
Certificate III in Graphic Design
Certificate III in Web Design

=== School of Humanities & Education ===
The School of Humanities and Education (SHE) offers the following programmes:

School of Humanities Programmes
Diploma Programmes
Diploma in Primary Education (2 Years)
Certificate Programmes
Certificate III in Early Childhood Education & Care
Certificate III in Basic Psychology
Certificate III in Educational Psychology
Certificate III in Organizational Psychology
Certificate I in Life Skills & Citizenship Values

== Affiliations ==
Cyryx College is affiliated with international partners such as Help University of Malaysia, whose bachelor's programmes in business and IT can be completed at Cyryx College. Other affiliated universities include SRM University, Sri Lanka; KDU, KBU, APIIT, Taylors, Limkokwing, and Binary College from Malaysia; RMIT University from Australia; and both Coventry and Plymouth University from the United Kingdom.

== Awards and achievements ==
Cyryx College has been given the following awards:

- National Public Service Award (2002)
- Education Leadership Award (2013)
- World Quality Commitment Award (2013), a vanity award

== See also ==
- Education in the Maldives
