= Mandhu College =

Private college in Malé, Maldives

Coordinates: 4.175189°N 73.510632°E

- Company type: Education
- Founded: 1998; 28 years ago
- Headquarters: Male', Maldives
- Key people: Ibrahim Ismail, Chairman
- Website: www.mandhucollege.edu.mv

Mandhu College (formerly Mandhu Learning Centre) is a private college providing Higher Education in the Maldives. Mandhu College collaborates with universities in UK and Australia to provide accredited tertiary courses locally. The Mandhu Learning Centre was established in 1998, and later inaugurated as the Mandhu College in December 2009. The courses taught at Mandhu College are accredited by the Maldives Qualifications Authority.

== Programs ==
- Certificate III in Information Technology
- Certificate III in Business(Business Management)
- Certificate III in Tourism & Hospitality
- Certificate III in Teaching (Primary & Middle School)
- Advanced Certificate in Office Management
- Advanced Certificate in Teaching (Primary & Middle School)
- Advanced Certificate for Business & Information Technology
- Foundation Course for Degree Studies
- Diploma in Teaching (Primary & Middle School)
- Diploma in Business
- Diploma in Information Technology
- Associate Degree in Teaching
- Associate Degree in Business
- Associate Degree in Information Technology
- Bachelor of Education (Primary & Middle School)
- Bachelor of Education (Secondary)
- Bachelor of Business
- Bachelor of Information Technology
- Post Graduate Certificate in Business
- Master of Business Administration
- Master of Education
