= Kanditheemu =

Kanditheemu ކަނޑިތީމު
- Inhabited island
- Location in Maldives
- Coordinates: 06°26′20″N 72°55′00″E
- Country: Maldives
- Geographic atoll: Miladhummadulhu Atoll
- Administrative atoll: Shaviyani Atoll
- Distance to Malé: 258.78 km (160.80 mi)

Dimensions
  - Length: 1.720 km (1.069 mi)
  - Width: 0.700 km (0.435 mi)

Population (2014)
  - Total: 1,094 (including foreigners)
- Time zone: UTC+05:00 (MST)

Kanditheemu (Dhivehi: ކަނޑިތީމު) is one of the inhabited islands of Shaviyani Atoll administrative and geographically part of the Miladhummadulhu Atoll in the Maldives.

== History ==
The oldest written sample of the Thaana script in which the Dhivehi language is written is found in Kanditheemu. It is inscribed on the door posts of the main Hukuru Miskiy (Friday mosque) of the island. The dates 1008AH (1599AD) and 1020AH (1611AD) are written on either sides of the door as the dates for the building and the renewal of the roof during the reigns of Ibrahim Kalaafaan (Sultan Ibrahim III) and Hussain Faamuladeyri Kilege (Sultan Hussain II) respectively.

== Geography ==
The island is 258.78 km (161 mi; 140 nmi) north of the country's capital, Malé. The island lies on the North West of the atoll near the border with Miladhunmadulhu-Thiladhunmathi atoll borders.

The total land area of the island is 0.89 km^{2} (0.34 sq mi) and surrounded by deep lagoons on the northern and southern end of the island, where boats can be anchored. The main occupation of the people of Kanditheemu is fishing.

== Demography ==
Historical population
Year	Pop.	±%
2006	1,148	—
2014	1,071	−6.7%
2006-2014: Census populations Source:
