= Billabong High International School Maldives =

Educational institution in the Maldives

Coordinates: 4°10′27.12″N 73°30′39.29″E

Information
- School type: Primary, Secondary
- Established: February 2009
- Status: Active
- Grades: 1-12
- Average class size: 25 students
- Houses: Peace, Freedom, Unity, Equality
- Website: www.billabonghigh.mv

Billabong High International School is an international school in the Maldives. The school enrolls more than 650 students. It is a full day school with classes from 8:05 a.m. to 2:45 pm, teaching an international curriculum developed from Kangaroo Kids Education Limited until the 8th grade. Grades 9 and 10 follow the IGCSE curriculum; after which grades 11 and 12 follow the AS and A Levels, respectively. A full day at Billabong includes 40-minute periods, a snack break of 15 minutes, and a 20-minute lunch break. The school also contains extracurricular sports and clubs such as badminton, football, basketball, athletics, table tennis, and swimming. The school has been divided into three groups with elementary for grades 1–4, middle for grades 5–8, and high/senior for grades 9–12. The school's houses are Peace, Freedom, Unity and Equality.

The first international school in Male, Billabong High, started in 2009. The school belongs to Islanders Education, represented by Abdul Rasheed. The school consists of a preschool under the name Kangaroo Kids International Preschool, and primary and secondary schools under the name Billabong High. Under sub franchise basis Islanders Education also established Billabong High and Kangaroo Kids schools in Addu Atoll—Hithadhoo, Fuvahmulah and Thinadhoo. Islanders Education opened and operate schools such as, Finland International School Maldives in association with EduCluster Finland, Ameer Ahmed community School (a subsidised community pre school), IQRA International Pre Schools under its Foundation for A Better Future in 6 islands of Maldives. Islanders Education is the largest private educator in Maldives.

== Clubs ==
Students are given the opportunity to join different clubs in the school. Each year, the club curriculum is revised with new activities.

=== List of Clubs ===
- TED-Ed Club
- Photography Club
- Culinary Art Club
- Young Social Entrepreneurs
- Media Club
- Literary Club
- Robotics Club
- Young Coders Club
- Model United Nations
- Radio Club
- Hues & Forms (Art Club)
