= Meedhoo (Raa Atoll) =

Meedhoo މީދޫ
- Inhabited island
- Location in Maldives
- Coordinates: 05°27′29″N 72°57′20″E
- Country: Maldives
- Administrative atoll: Raa Atoll
- Distance to Malé: 154.56 km (96.04 mi)

Dimensions
  - Length: 0.825 km (0.513 mi)
  - Width: 0.550 km (0.342 mi)

Population (2022)
  - Total: 1,872
- Time zone: UTC+05:00 (MST)

Meedhoo (Dhivehi: މީދޫ) is one of the inhabited islands of Raa Atoll. The Raa Atoll Education Center is located in Meedhoo.

== History ==
Meedhoo was first settled 300 years ago from the island Bodufushi, while Old Friday mosque in Meedhoo was said to be built more than 250 years ago.

== Geography ==
The island is 154.56 km (96 mi; 83 nmi) northwest of the country's capital, Malé.

== Demography ==
Historical population
Year	Pop.	±%
2006	1,867	—
2014	2,053	+10.0%
2024	2,453	+19.5%
Census populations Source:
