= Innamaadhoo =

Innamaadhoo އިއްނަމާދޫ
- Inhabited island
- Location in Maldives
- Coordinates: 05°32′59″N 73°02′39″E
- Country: Maldives
- Administrative atoll: Raa Atoll
- Distance to Malé: 160.49 km (99.72 mi)

Dimensions
  - Length: 0.875 km (0.544 mi)
  - Width: 0.475 km (0.295 mi)

Population (Sep 2025)
  - Total: 962
- Time zone: UTC+05:00 (MST)

Innamaadhoo (Dhivehi: އިއްނަމާދޫ) is one of the inhabited islands of Raa Atoll in the Maldives.

== Geography ==
The island is 160.49 km (100 mi; 87 nmi) north of the country's capital, Malé.

=== Climate ===
Tropical monsoon climate prevails in the area. Average annual temperature in the neighborhood is 26°C. The warmest month is April, when the average temperature is 28°C, and the coldest is January, at 26°C. The annual average is 2,146 mm (84.5 in). The rainiest month is November, with an average of 363 mm (14.3 in) rainfall, and the driest is February, with 52 mm (2 in) rainfall.

== Demography ==
Innamaadhoo counted 333 women and 383 men, as of September 2006.

Historical population
Year	Pop.	±%
2006	537	—
2014	504	−6.1%
2022	663	+31.5%
2006-2022: Census populations Source:

== Economy ==
Carpentry is the island's main business. On looking at the whole country, the carpentry experts are mostly from Innamaadhoo. From very small fishing boats to large ships are built on this island.

Even though wheat was grown a few decades ago, farming is not a very wide field.

The islanders used to fish a lot in the 1990s. Salting fish was a very wide field. Though, now, as the field perished, fishermen and fish-sellers are much less. The reason is believed to be because carpentry pays well (carpentry is a very good money-maker).

Inhabitants don't contribute directly to the field of tourism, which may be because there is no resort nearby. Though, a lot of diving boats, rowing boats and ferries, etc. (needed for resorts) are built here.
