= Narudhoo =

Narudhoo ނަރުދޫ
- Inhabited Island
- Location in Maldives
- Coordinates: 06°15′48″N 73°12′53″E
- Country: Maldives
- Geographic atoll: Miladhummadulhu Atoll
- Administrative atoll: Shaviyani Atoll
- Distance to Malé: 232.22 km (144.29 mi)

Dimensions
  - Length: 0.850 km (0.528 mi)
  - Width: 0.650 km (0.404 mi)

Population (2022)
  - Total: 544
- Time zone: UTC+05:00 (MST)

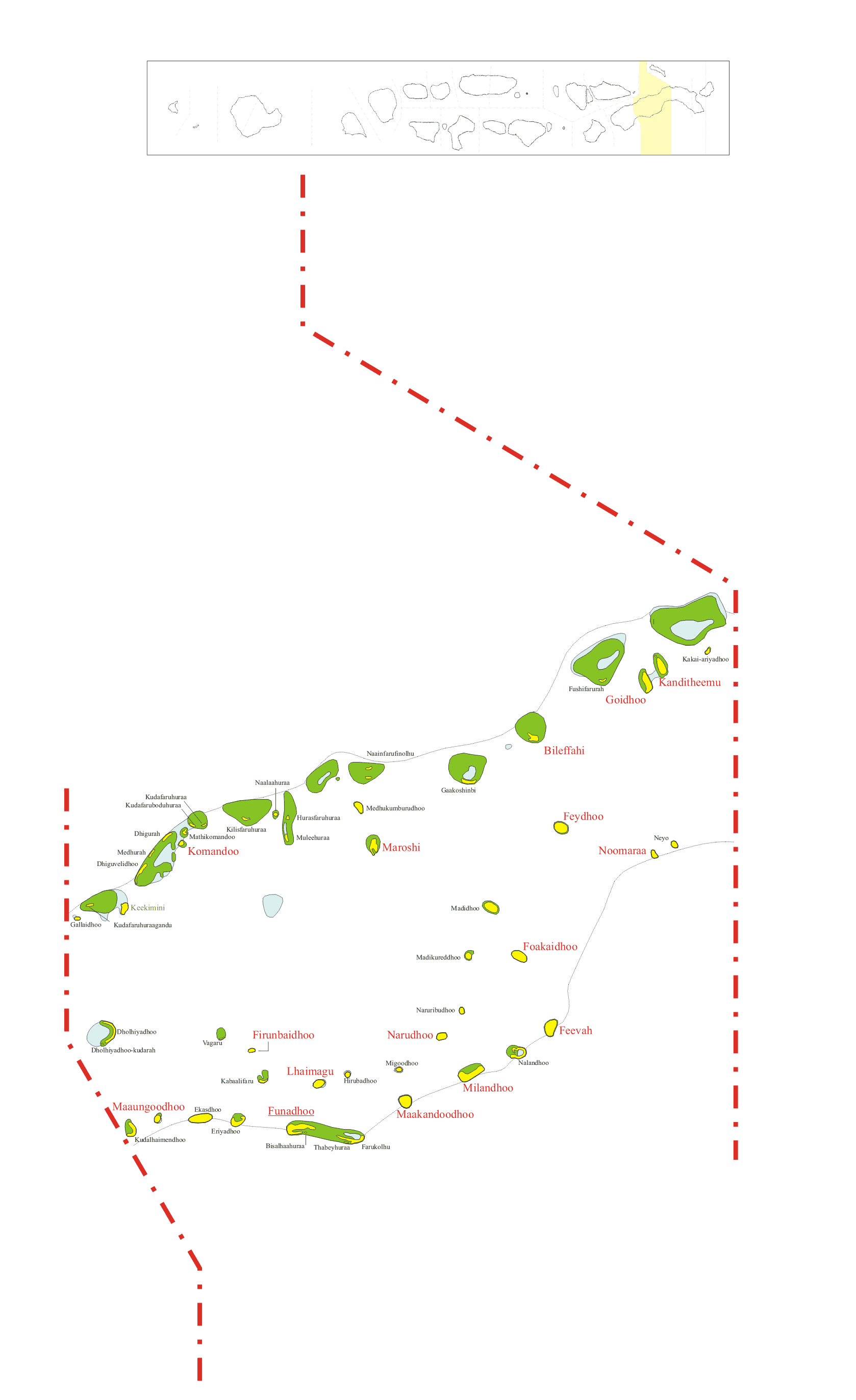
Summary of islands

Narudhoo (Dhivehi: ނަރުދޫ) is one of the inhabited islands of the Shaviyani Atoll administrative division and geographically part of the Miladhummadulhu Atoll in the Maldives.

== Geography ==
The island is 233.2 km (145 mi; 126 nmi) north of the country's capital, Malé.

== Demography ==
Historical population
Year	Pop.	±%
2006	426	—
2014	472	+10.8%
2022	544	+15.3%
2006-2014-2022: Census populations Source:
