= Kinolhas =

Kinolhas ކިނޮޅަސް
- Inhabited island
- Location in Maldives
- Coordinates: 05°26′58″N 73°01′41″E
- Country: Maldives
- Administrative atoll: Raa Atoll
- Distance to Malé: 150.66 km (93.62 mi)

Area
  - Total: 0.537 km^{2} (0.207 sq mi)

Dimensions
  - Length: 1.925 km (1.196 mi)
  - Width: 0.375 km (0.233 mi)

Population (2025)
  - Total: 850 (including foreigners)
  - Density: 1,600/km^{2} (4,100/sq mi)
- Time zone: UTC+05:00 (MST)

Kinolhas (Dhivehi: ކިނޮޅަސް) is one of the inhabited islands of the Raa Atoll administrative division of the Maldives.

== History ==
The island is known to have been ruled by a man from Somalia named Abd al-Aziz of Mogadishu in the 14th century, and was visited by the traveller Ibn Batuta during this time.

== Geography ==
The island is 150.66 km (94 mi; 81 nmi) north of the country's capital, Malé.

== Demography ==
Historical population
Year	Pop.	±%
2006	345	—
2014	432	+25.2%
2022	543	+25.7%
2006-2022: Census populations Source:

=== Migration ===
Due to the poor quality and limitations of some of the basic services such as healthcare, education and a lack of economical job opportunities, nearly 30% of the registered residents of the island live in the country's capital, Malé.

== Governance ==
=== Crime ===
The island hardly has any record of serious crimes like drugs, theft and robbery.

== Economy ==
Most common source of economical work for the residents are fishing and agriculture. Some of the residents also work at Pearl Island Resort in Meedhuhparu Island, a resort Island nearby. Many residents live in Malé and work there too.

=== NGOs ===
The most active NGO in the island is Jamiyyathul Ihthihad. Jamiyyathul Ihthihad conducts various activities to islanders for the benefit and the development of the Island. Such activities include the Training Programs and Capacity Building programs on Various fields including Information Technology, Quran recitation Competitions, Football and Volleyball Competition and Bashi Ball Competition for Women. They also carryout other various awareness campaigns Targeted on areas such as Religion, Health and Education.

== Education ==
The main facility that offers primary and secondary education on the island is Kinolhahu School. There are also pre-schools that provide early childhood education to the children of the island. According to data provided by the island office, 162 students are enrolled in Kinolhahu School. A total of 27 teachers work at the school, along with 9 government staff members.

== Healthcare ==
The Health Centre provides basic healthcare services to the islanders, such as treatment for minor injuries, cuts, and common colds or flu. In cases of serious health issues, islanders must travel to the nearest regional hospital, located in the atoll capital, Ungoofaaru. The journey takes approximately 45 minutes by speedboat.

A total of 9 staff members work at the Health Centre: 1 Medical Officer, 1 male nurse, 2 female nurses, 1 Administrative Officer, 1 translator, 1 family health worker, 1 helper, and 1 attendant. As is common in the Maldivian health sector, some staff members are expatriates. The Medical Officer, Dr. Adeel Akram, is from Pakistan. The male nurse, Syam Kumar, and one of the female nurses are from India. The remaining staff members are locals.
