= Ghaazee School =

Government School in Hulhumalé, Maldives

Coordinates: 4.213122°N 73.541788°E

- ޣާޒީ ސްކޫލް

Information
- School type: Primary, and Secondary
- Motto: Progress with Purpose
- Religious affiliation: Islam
- Founded: 25 October 2007
- Status: Active
- Principal: Basheera Mohamed
- Deputy Principals: Moosa Adam and Aminath Riyaza
- Gender: Male and Female
- Website: ghaazee.edu.mv
- Last updated: 25 December 2024

Ghaazee School is a government school, located in Hulhumale', Maldives. It is a unisex school that teaches students to the primary as well as secondary level of education. English medium is followed in teaching with the exception of Dhivehi, Islam, Quran and Arabic.

== History ==
The school is named after As-Sulṭaan al-Ghaazee Muhammad Thakurufaanu al A'uẓam. It was built by the Government of Singapore and the Singapore Red Cross Society as part of the assistant package following the 2004 Indian Ocean tsunami. The School was officially opened on 25 October 2007 by Maldivian president Maumoon Abdul Gayoom and Singaporean president S. R. Nathan. The previous principal of the school was Mariyam Mohamed, currently, the principal is Basheera Mohamed and the Deputy Principals are Moosa Adam and Aminath Riyaza. The School teaches from LKG to Grade 10. The school currently has over 1000 students.

In 2018, teachers of Ghaazee School were threatened by the management of the school for coming out to support Ibrahim Mohamed Solih during the 2018 Maldivian presidential election.

In 2020, the school was used as a shelter during the COVID-19 lockdowns by the Education Ministry.

In September 2022, a teacher was beaten up for acting inappropriately and showing explicit videos to a student was arrested pending an outcome of the trial. Later in December, staff were protesting against a former administrator after the Education Ministry moved them to a different section of the school after they are facing numerous allegations of corruption, fraud, theft, etc.

== Departments ==
| Department | Head of Department |
|---|---|
| Exploring Science & Physical Science | Jeneena Ali |
| Islam Department | Ali Abdhulla |
| Dhivehi Department | Aishath Azra |
| Mathematics Department | Ibrahim Hafik |
| Business Department | Aminath Shifaza |
| Life Science | Shehenaz Latheef |
| English Department | Biju Joseph |
