= Inguraidhoo =

Inhabited island of Maldives

Inguraidhoo އިނގުރައިދޫ
- Inhabited island
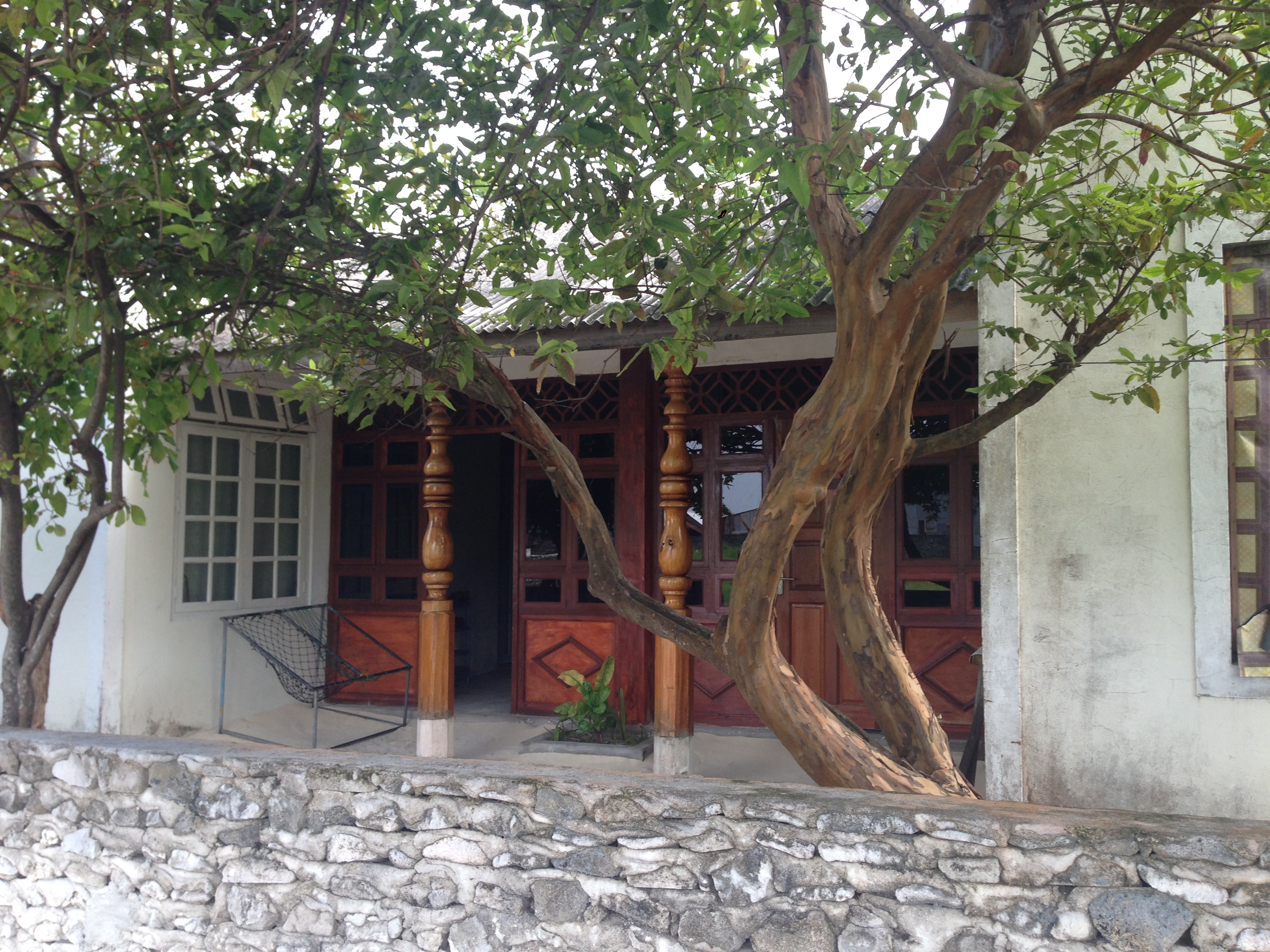

- Location in Maldives
- Coordinates: 05°28′39″N 73°02′10″E
- Country: Maldives
- Administrative atoll: Raa Atoll
- Distance to Malé: 153.25 km (95.23 mi)

Dimensions
  - Length: 1.420 km (0.882 mi)
  - Width: 0.325 km (0.202 mi)

Population (2022)
  - Total: 1,278
- Time zone: UTC+05:00 (MST)

Inguraidhoo (Dhivehi: އިނގުރައިދޫ) is one of the inhabited islands of Raa Atoll, Maldives.

== Geography ==
The island is 153.25 km (95 mi; 83 nmi) north of the country's capital, Malé.

== Demography ==
Historical population
Year	Pop.	±%
2006	1,278	—
2014	1,134	−11.3%
2022	1,278	+12.7%
2006-2014-2022: Census populations Source:
