= Huravee School =

Public school in Hulhumalé, Maldives

- ހުރަވީ ސްކޫލް
- Logo since 2019

Location
- Ranauraa Magu; Hulhumalé; Malé, Kaafu Atoll; Republic of Maldives
- Coordinates: 4.219644°N 73.544341°E

Information
- School type: Government Public
- Motto: Building Bright Futures
- Religious affiliation: Islam
- Established: 13 January 2019
- Principal: Mohamed Haleem
- Teaching staff: 190 (2021)
- Grades: 1–10
- Language: English and Dhivehi
- Classrooms: 53 (2 classrooms specialized for students with special needs)
- Colour
- Song: Huravee School Song
- Website: huravee.edu.mv
- Last updated: 6th October 2025

Huravee School (Dhivehi: ހުރަވީ ސްކޫލް) is the biggest school in the Maldives. It was inaugurated by the former president of Maldives, Ibrahim Mohamed Solih on 13 January 2019. It is located in Neighborhood 1 of Hulhumalé. The school participates in various inter-school competitions and normal competitions. When the school first opened, it taught from LKG to Grade 10 and Cambridge O'Level programs. As of 2024, the school teaches from Grade 1 to Grade 10.

== History ==
Huravee School is named after Sultan al-Ghazi al-Hassan Izzuddin al-Huravee (Dhonbandaarain), the king who liberated Maldives, from the Malabar conquest in the 18th century. The construction of the school was contracted to Amin Construction for Rf. 132,000,000. It started with 600 students and as of 2021, the school had more than 1500 students. After the school changed to double session in 2022, the school's student enrollment rate has gone significantly higher. As of 2024, Huravee school teaches over 2500 students and employs over 250 teachers.

The school building is a seven-story building with three blocks and two lifts. It has open spaces in all floors providing teachers a recess area and universal access ramps allowing wheelchair access for disabled students and pathway for emergency exits.

== Incidents in Huravee School ==
An incident occurred at Huravee School in 2019 involving an autistic child from Fiyavathi. At around 11:55 PM, a parent informed police officers stationed outside the school that a child was stuck on the staircase. The police entered the school and investigated, but by the time they arrived, the child had already been removed from the spot.

The police believe the incident took place within the school, marking what is possibly the fourth such occurrence involving a child from Fiyavathi. The police also noted that they had received similar reports in the past.

Two photographs were taken by a passerby showing the child hanging out over the corridor. However, the police suggested that one of the images might have been taken on a different day, as the child’s appearance and the corridor differed between the two photos. The first photo depicted the child in a corridor with green railings, while the second showed the child in a corridor with a white railings, indicating different floors.

The Ministry of Education, upon being contacted, confirmed they had received the report and took immediate action, though the specifics of the action were not disclosed. The school did not respond to requests for comment.

Another incident occurred on 17 October 2024 at the school, where a female student from Class 7-E died. The police reported that the incident was brought to their attention in the morning. The 13-year-old girl was rushed to Hulhumalé Hospital after suffering a medical emergency, but the hospital confirmed that she was already deceased upon arrival. The girl is believed to have died from a seizure, and there were no signs of life when she was brought to the hospital.

== School houses ==
The four school houses of Huravee School are:

Name of House	Color
Sirikula	Yellow
Bavana	Blue
Kahthiri	Purple
Ranmeeba	Red

== Student Council ==
The Huravee School Student Council is the main student body that does a variety of actions for the betterment of Huravee School such as planning or organizing activities for the school and attending and representing Huravee School on forums or conferences. The school council consists of:

- School Captain
- Male Deputy Captain
- Female Deputy Captain
- Activity Captain
- Female Deputy Activity Captain
- Male Deputy Activity Captain
- House Captain
- House Deputy Captain
- Scout Leader
- Scout Deputy Leader
- Guide Leader
- Guide Deputy Leader
- Band Leader
- Band Deputy Leader
- Cadet Leader
- Cadet Deputy Leader
- Club Presidents (Traffic Monitor is defined as an club activity)

The school appoints the council members by examining the students academics and participations which amount to 60%, The other 40% is checked in a vote, forming a modified first past the post system. In 2025, the Ministry of Education sent an internal notice which informed Huravee faculty to disband representative posts for Grade 7 and above.

== Prefect Board ==
Huravee School has a prefect board consisting of:

- Student Council
- Junior Post Holders
- Prefects

Prefects are chosen based on academic merit, discipline record, and grade average. However, prefects can be de-badged due to several reasons such as disciplinary issues. The threshold for maintaining or applying for a school post is an average of at least 75% academically.

== School values and philosophy ==
Huravee School has many core principles that define what Huravee School is and what the school wants to achieve. These core values reflect how Huravee Schools' educational approach is shaped towards an Islam based, Maldives-first system.

=== Core values ===
- Caring and kindness
- Believe in diversity
- Love of knowledge
- Self development
- Strive for success
- Work collaboratively

=== Mission ===
We strive to build patriotic, self-reliant and responsible bright futures by adopting holistic education, enhancing intellectual, physical and social development, within Islamic and cultural values.

=== Vision ===
“An institution of choice for the holistic development of every individual".

== Facilities ==
Facilities	Description
Multipurpose hall	The hall used for a variety of activities like school events, assemblies, and performances. It is used for different types of gatherings, from sports events to cultural programs.
Conference Room	A large space for meetings and discussions. It’s equipped with everything needed for staff meetings, parent-teacher discussions, or special presentations.
Prayer Room	A separate room where students and staff can pray in school.
Resource Rooms	These rooms are stocked with resources and items for teaching and other school activities.
Rooms for Extracurricular Activities	These spaces dedicated to activities like music, drama, art, and other hobbies. These rooms allow students to explore their creativity and get involved in after-school clubs or projects. E.g. Dhasveshi
Kitchen Space	A small area where students and staff can prepare food and other culinary items in relation to school projects or courses.
Library	A large room filled with story books and other books where students can borrow books from the library and read at the library. The school library also stocks the school books and other student material
Computer Laboratory	This room is equipped with computers and internet access along and is used as the main classroom for computer science. The computer lab is also where the S.T.E.M. Club have their meetings.
Audio Visual Room	A room equipped with projectors and a sound system, the room is used for presenting presentations and other types of multi media.
Vocational Hub	A hands-on learning space where students can explore practical skills like carpentry, tailoring, and other skills. It’s a place to learn skills that are useful in many jobs.
Mariyaadhu (Recreational Hub)	A fun relaxing space for students to relax and is equipped with games such as carrom and chess.

== Extracurricular programs and clubs ==
Huravee School has many extracurricular activities and offers a variety of after school clubs. However only students from Grade 7 through Grade 10 are allowed to participate in clubs. The clubs are:

Dhivehi Name	Dhivehi Latin Name	English Name
ނޫރު	Noor	Islam Club and Human Rights Club
ބައްސަ	Bassa	Dhivehi and English Club
ހިއްސާ	Hissa	Business Club
ނާރެސް	Naares	S.T.E.M (Science, Technology, Engineering and Math) Club
ވެށި	Veshi	Environment Club
ދުވެލި	Dhuveli	Health and Sports Club
ތޫރަ	Thoora	Media Club
އެވޭލާ	Eveyla	Arts and Culture Club

Huravee School also has a Scout group, (32nd Male Scout Group), a Cadet Corps, a Girl Guide group, and a Student Traffic Monitor program. Scouts, Cadet, and Traffic Monitor allow students of both genders to participate in their extracurricular activities. They participate in many inter-school tournaments, such as Chess, Netball, Football, and Swimming competitions. They also participate in Quran tournaments, and Dhivehi oration and literature tournaments.
