= Goidhoo (Baa Atoll) =

Goidhoo ގޮއިދޫ
- Inhabited island
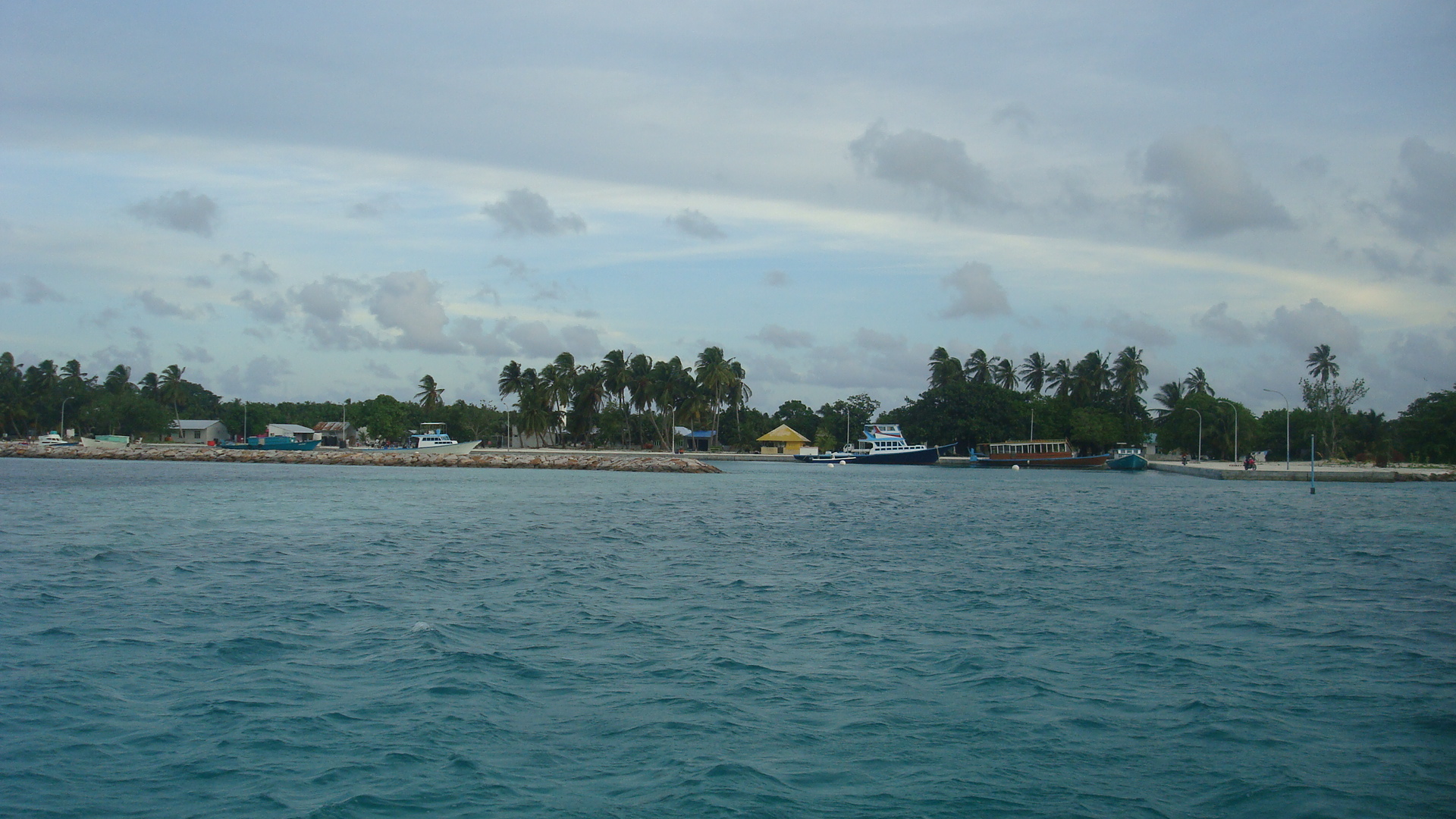
- Goidhoo Harbor, when entering Goidhoo

- Location in Maldives
- Coordinates: 04°52′25″N 72°59′59″E
- Country: Maldives
- Administrative atoll: Baa Atoll
- Distance to Malé: 95.69 km (59.46 mi)

Area
  - Total: 1.1354 km^{2} (0.4384 sq mi)

Dimensions
  - Length: 2.130 km (1.324 mi)
  - Width: 1.580 km (0.982 mi)

Population (2022)
  - Total: 583
  - Density: 513/km^{2} (1,330/sq mi)
- Time zone: UTC+05:00 (MST)

Goidhoo (Dhivehi: ގޮއިދޫ) is one of the inhabited islands of Southern Maalhosmadulhu Atoll.

== History ==
In the 19th century, a female African slave who had been bought by the king on his Hajj trip to Mecca was formally released from slavery and was settled in Goidhoo island. A house and a well were built for her. This African woman was called Salaamaa. She had been working for years at the palace in Malé before the ailing king released her in order to gain merit in the afterlife.

The freeing of slaves before the death of the owner was traditionally a common practice among the very high nobility in the Maldives. Now there are some families from Goidhoo that can trace their descendency to this African ancestor.

== Geography ==
The island is 95.69 km (59 mi; 52 nmi) northwest of the country's capital, Malé.

=== Horsburgh Atoll ===
Goidhu Island lies in a small separate atoll along with Fulhadu and Fehendhu. Goidhoo Atoll (also Goidu or Goifulhafehendhu), Horsburgh Atoll in the Admiralty Chart, is separated from South Maalhosmadulhu by a six-mile-broad (9.7 km) channel. This atoll is oval in shape and small, its greatest length being 10 miles (16 km). The inner lagoon has a depth of 17 to 20 fathoms; it has a sandy bottom mixed with mud and clay. Unlike the lagoons of most small atolls of the Maldives, this lagoon is free from coral heads in its centre.

In the Admiralty charts, this atoll is named after James Horsburgh, hydrographer to the East India Company and author of the long-titled Directions for Sailing to and from the East Indies, China, New Holland, Cape of Good Hope, and the interjacent Ports, compiled chiefly from original Journals and Observations made during 21 years' experience in navigating those Seas. Horsburgh's Directory was the standard work for oriental navigation in the first half of the 19th century, until Robert Moresby's survey of the Maldives when for the first time in history accurate maps of the atolls were published.

== Demography ==
Historical population
Year	Pop.	±%
2006	503	—
2014	507	+0.8%
2022	583	+15.0%
2006-2022: Census populations Source:

== See also ==
- James Horsburgh
