= Fehendhoo =

Fehendhoo ފެހެންދޫ
- Inhabited island
- Location in Maldives
- Coordinates: 4°52′50.77″N 72°58′19.02″E
- Country: Maldives
- Administrative atoll: Baa Atoll
- Distance to Malé: 98.17 km (61.00 mi)

Area
  - Total: 0.206 km^{2} (0.080 sq mi)

Dimensions
  - Length: 2.160 km (1.342 mi)
  - Width: 0.220 km (0.137 mi)

Population (2022)
  - Total: 198
  - Density: 961/km^{2} (2,490/sq mi)
- Time zone: UTC+05:00 (MST)

Fehendhoo (Dhivehi: ފެހެންދޫ) is one of the inhabited islands of Southern Maalhosmadulhu Atoll, code letter "Baa" in the Dhivehi alphabet and code letter "F-15" in English.

== Geography ==
The island is 98.17 km (61 mi; 53 nmi) northwest of the country's capital, Malé.

=== Horsburgh Atoll ===
This atoll is a separate atoll along with Goidhu Island et Fulhadhu. Goidhoo Atoll, (also Goidu or Goifulhafehendhu), appears as Horsburgh Atoll in the Admiralty Chart is separated from South Maalhosmadulhu by a 6-mile broad channel. This atoll is oval in shape and small, its greatest length being 10 miles. The inner lagoon has a depth of 17 to 20 fathoms; it has a sandy bottom mixed with mud and clay. Unlike the lagoons of most small atolls of the Maldives, this lagoon is free from coral heads in its centre.

In the Admiralty Charts, this atoll is named after James Horsburgh, hydrographer to the East India Company and author of the "Directions for Sailing to and from the East Indies, China, New Holland, Cape of Good Hope, and the interjacent Ports, compiled chiefly from original Journals and Observations made during 21 years' experience in navigating those Seas".

== Demography ==
Historical population
| Year | Pop. | ±% |
|---|---|---|
| 2006 | 114 | — |
| 2014 | 99 | −13.2% |
| 2022 | 198 | +100.0% |
2006-2022: Census populations Source:

== See also ==
- James Horsburgh
- Reethi Beach
