= Maldives Polytechnic =

Coordinates: 4.170538°N 73.510338°E

- މޯލްޑިވްސް ޕޮލިޓެކްނިކް
- Former names: Faculty of Engineering Technology (FET)
- Type: Public
- Established: 2010; 16 years ago
- Students: Approx. 300
- Location: Maldives
- Campus: Multiple Sites
- Language: English
- Website: www.polytechnic.edu.mv

Maldives Polytechnic is a Maldivian government training institute established to offer technical and vocational education and training throughout the country. It was previously known as VTC, MITE, and then became a Faculty of MCHE (now Maldives National University) and now Maldives Polytechnic under the Ministry of Higher Education.

The decision to establish the institution was made on 9 February 2010 after discussing a paper submitted by Ministry of Education. The polytechnic was established on 12 April 2010 under the authority stated in Article 116 of the Constitution of Republic of Maldives.
