= Maaungoodhoo =

Maaungoodhoo މާއުނގޫދޫ
- Inhabited island
- Location in Maldives
- Coordinates: 06°04′10″N 73°16′52″E
- Country: Maldives
- Geographic atoll: North Miladhummadulhu Atoll
- Administrative atoll: Shaviyani Atoll
- Distance to Malé: 210.98 km (131.10 mi)

Government
  - Council President: Mohamed Irufaam

Dimensions
  - Length: 0.650 km (0.404 mi)
  - Width: 0.500 km (0.311 mi)

Population (2022)
  - Total: 944
- Time zone: UTC+05:00 (MST)

Maaungoodhoo (Dhivehi: މާއުނގޫދޫ) is one of the inhabited islands of the Shaviyani Atoll administrative division and geographically part of the Miladhummadulhu Atoll in the Maldives.

== Geography ==
The island is 210.98 km (131 mi; 114 nmi) north of the country's capital, Malé.

== Demography ==
Historical population
Year	Pop.	±%
2006	795	—
2014	774	−2.6%
2022	944	+22.0%
2006-2014-2022: Census populations Source:
