= Jalaluddin School =

School in Kulhudhuffushi, Haa Dhaalu Atoll, Maldives

Coordinates: 6.626701°N 73.070395°E

Jalaluddin School ޖަލާލުއްދީން ސްކޫލް

Address
- Ameenee Magu; Kulhudhuffushi, Haa Dhaalu Atoll; Maldives

Information
- Motto: Disciplined and Determined
- Founded: 1997
- Principal: Aminath Mohamed
- Grades: 1-12

Jalaluddin School, (Dhivehi: ޖަލާލުއްދީން ސްކޫލް, also spelled Jalaaluddin and formerly known as Northern Secondary School) is a school in Kulhudhuffushi, Haa Dhaalu Atoll, Maldives. It teaches grades 1–12. Jalaluddin students have been among those receiving the President's Medal for achieving first place in the world top ten in A level examinations. The school had also produced athletes and had participated in activities. It also offers courses in vocational education.

== History ==
It was named after Sheikh Abdullah Jalaluddin. It opened on 15 February 1998 with a hall and 10 class rooms, a library, school office and a supervisor room. Starting with fewer than 200 students, it is now one of the most recognized and established schools in the Maldives.

In 2002, higher secondary education was introduced.

By 2004, it offered O Levels through Cambridge International Examinations and A Levels through Edexcel.

In 2019, primary grades were introduced.

In July 2022, the Ministry of Education hired a contractor to build more classrooms in Jalaluddin. In October 2022, Dhiraagu provided computer systems, furniture, gym exercise balls, books and puzzles and other resources to the school's Special Education Unit.

In 2023, on the occasion of Jalaluddin's Silver jubilee, Jalaluddin's Leading teacher Mohammad Hussain wrote a book about historical information aout the school, former principals and staff members, school achievements, best all-rounder students, photographs of the school and more.
