= Fulhadhoo =

Island in the Maldives

Fulhadhoo ފުޅަދޫ
- Inhabited island
- Location in Maldives
- Coordinates: 04°53′07″N 72°56′00″E
- Country: Maldives
- Administrative atoll: Baa Atoll
- Distance to Malé: 101.21 km (62.89 mi)

Area
  - Total: 0.315 km^{2} (0.122 sq mi)

Dimensions
  - Length: 1.920 km (1.193 mi)
  - Width: 0.250 km (0.155 mi)

Population (2022)
  - Total: 341
  - Density: 1,080/km^{2} (2,800/sq mi)
- Time zone: UTC+05:00 (MST)

Fulhadhoo (Dhivehi: ފުޅަދޫ) is one of the inhabited islands of Southern Maalhosmadulhu Atoll, code letter "Baa", in Maldives. It is 31.5 hectares (78 acres) in area.

== Geography ==
The island is 101.21 km (63 mi; 55 nmi) northwest of the country's capital, Malé.

=== Goifulhafehendhoo Atoll ===
This island lies in a small separate atoll along with Goidhu and Fehendhu, as well as four smaller uninhabited islets . Goidhoo Atoll (also Goidu or Goifulhafehendhu), Horsburgh Atoll in the Admiralty Chart, is separated from South Maalhosmadulhu by a 6 nmi (11 km) broad channel. This atoll is oval in shape and small, its greatest length being 16 km (10 mi). The total area of the atoll (including lagoon and reef flat) is 105 km^{2} (26,000 acres), of which only 1.7 km^{2} (420 acres) is dry land. The inner lagoon has a depth of 17 to 20 fathoms (31 to 37 m); it has a sandy bottom mixed with mud and clay. Unlike the lagoons of most small atolls of the Maldives, this lagoon is free from coral heads in its centre.

In the Admiralty Charts, this atoll is named after James Horsburgh, hydrographer to the East India Company and author of the "Directions for Sailing to and from the East Indies, China, New Holland, Cape of Good Hope, and the interjacent Ports, compiled chiefly from original Journals and Observations made during 21 years' experience in navigating those Seas".

== Demography ==
Historical population
Year	Pop.	±%
2006	194	—
2014	175	−9.8%
2022	341	+94.9%
2006-2022: Census populations Source:

== See also ==
- James Horsburgh
