= Centre for Higher Secondary Education Malé =

Higher secondary school in Malé, Maldives

Coordinates: 4.176885°N 73.511289°E

- ސެންޓަރ ފޮރ ހަޔަރ ސެކަންޑަރީ އެޑިޔުކޭޝަން މާލެ

Location
- Lily Magu; Galolhu; Malé; Maldives

Information
- Type: Higher Secondary
- Motto: Each one, Teach one
- Founded: 3 July 1979
- Principal: Abdulla Didi
- Houses: Ranmuiy, Feeroz, Asrafee, Yagooth
- Colour: Dark Blue
- Website: chsemale.edu.mv
- Last updated: 3 September 2026

Centre for Higher Secondary Education Malé (Dhivehi: ސެންޓަރ ފޮރ ހަޔަރ ސެކަންޑަރީ އެޑިޔުކޭޝަން މާލެ), more commonly known as CHSE-Malé (Dhivehi: ސީއެޗްއެސްއީ މާލެ), is a government run Higher Secondary school in Malé, Maldives, which caters only to A' level students. CHSE was inaugurated on 3 July 1979, under the name of the Science Education Centre, or SEC, with the aim of producing students qualified enough to enter universities abroad. It currently has over 1500 students and 90 teachers. It currently has two branches, one in Malé and the other in Hulhumalé.

== History ==
The SEC was established on 3 July 1979 by the former President of Maldives, Maumoon Abdul Gayoom. The school started with just 4 teachers and 47 students, with only 30 of those students sitting for the final examination. Initially, the school only taught A level physics, chemistry, biology and English. Economics and history were introduced the following year. Today, a wide range of A' level subjects are taught at the institution.

In 2001, the school was renamed to be the Centre for Higher Secondary Education.

In 2020, it was decided to construct a new CHSE building in Hulhumalé as the one in Malé didn't have enough space. In 2023, the old Male' CHSE building was given to Aminiya School. In 2024, it was planned for CHSE to open another building in Male', where it was named as CHSE-Malé, and the building in Hulhumalé was renamed to CHSE-Hulhumalé.

On 1 September 2024, CHSE-Male' was opened, and on 5 November 2024, President Mohamed Muizzu officially inaugurated the new building.

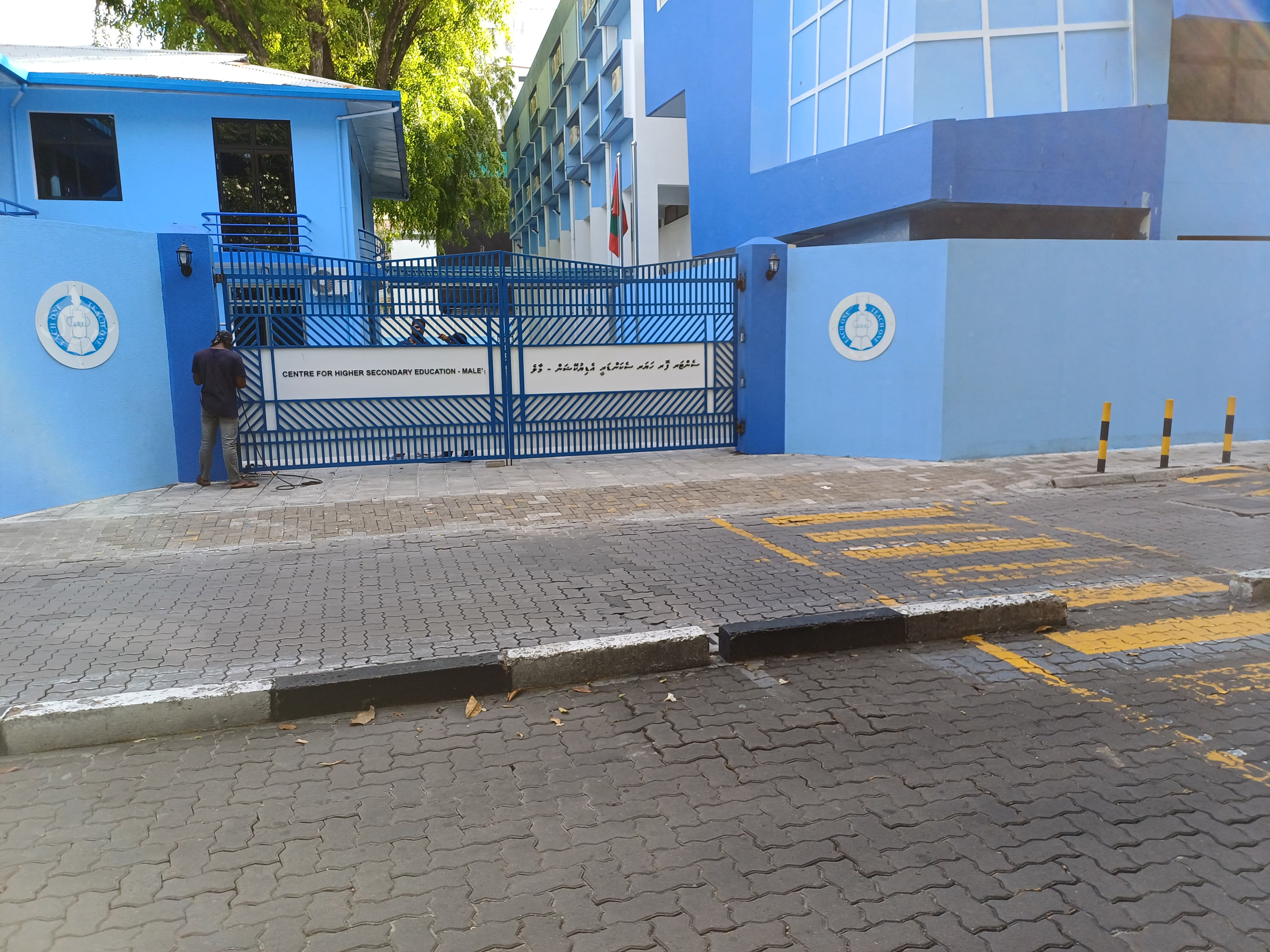
Front gate of the Centre for Higher Secondary Education Malé

== School Houses ==
In 2004, four school houses were introduced. They are:

Name of House	Colour
Ranmuiy	Gold
Yaagooth	Red
Feeroz	Green
Asrafee	Purple

Prior to 2004 the student body was divided into the following houses:

Name of
House
Quasar
Pulsar
Tensar
