= Aminiya School =

Primary, secondary school in Malé, Maldives

Coordinates: 4.176789°N 73.509849°E

- އަމީނިއްޔާ ސުކޫލް

Location
- Chandhanee Magu; Machchangolhi; Malé, Kaafu Atoll; Maldives

Information
- Former name: Al-Madharasathul Saniyya
- School type: Primary, Secondary
- Motto: Serve One Another
- Religious affiliation: Islam
- Founded: 28 November 1944
- Founder: Mohamed Amin Didi
- Status: Active
- Principal: Rinzy Ibrahim Waheed
- Deputy Principal: Suwaibath Saeed
- Deputy Principal: Fathimath Hilmy
- Teaching staff: 188
- Employees: 231
- Key people: 17
- Grades: 1–10 grades
- Primary years taught: 1st through 5th grade
- Secondary years taught: 6th through 10th grade
- Gender: Male and Female
- Age range: 6–17
- Student to teacher ratio: 1:27
- Language: Dhivehi and English
- Hours in school day: 6 hours
- Houses: Aminarani, Dhainkanba, Raadhafathi and Rehendhi
- Colours: Green and white
- Slogan: Serve one another
- Song: Aminiya School Song
- Annual tuition: Free for local residents
- Website: aminiya.edu.mv
- Last updated: 25 April 2025

Aminiya School is a primary and secondary school in Malé, the capital of the Maldives. It was the first girls' secondary school in the country and remained the only all-girls school until 14 June 2011.

== History ==
It was founded in 1944 by Mohamed Amin Didi to accommodate female students from Majeediyya School (then known as "Madhrasathul Saniyya") which became an all-boy institution. The school is divided into four houses, namely Aminarani, Dhainkanba, Raadhafathi and Rehendhi.

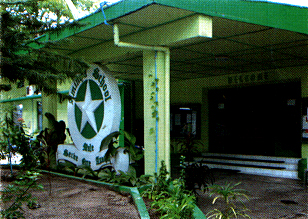
Aminiya School in 2006

Till 2011, the school remained as a secondary school for only girls. In 2011 the school established Primary, Grade 1 making it both a primary and secondary school. Now there are grades 1, 2, 3, 4, 5, 6 and 7 for primary, and grades 8, 9 and 10 for secondary. Aminiya school has high honours of prizes and a large number of Aminiya's most successful women came from here as students. In 2018, the school's insignia was preserved as a historical monument.

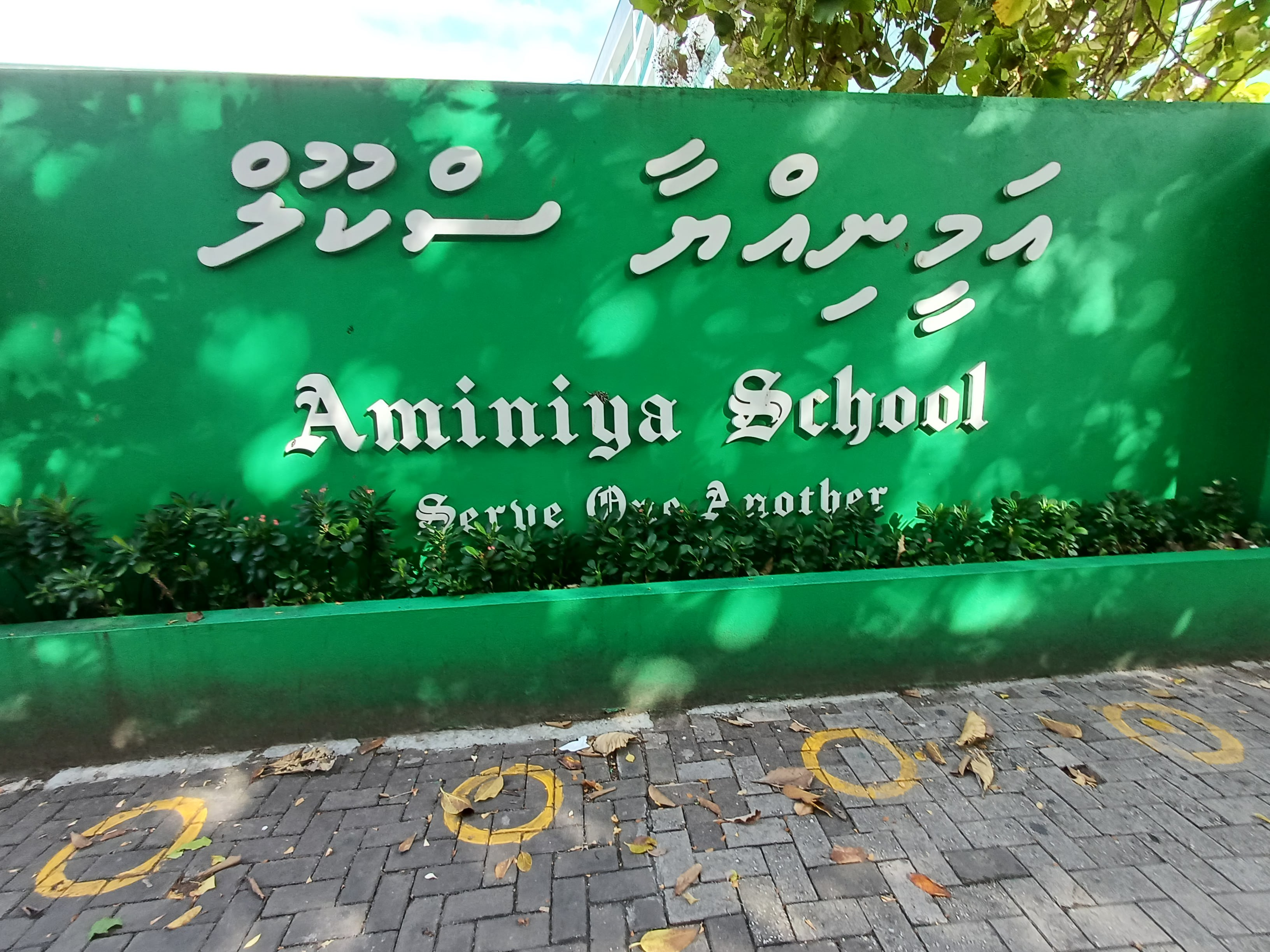
Aminiya School sign in 2024

== See also ==
- List of schools in the Maldives
