= Vaadhoo (Raa Atoll) =

Vaadhoo ވާދޫ
- Inhabited island
- Location in Maldives
- Coordinates: 05°51′19″N 72°59′27″E
- Country: Maldives
- Administrative atoll: Northern Maalhosmadulu Atoll
- Distance to Malé: 194.46 km (120.83 mi)

Dimensions
  - Length: 1.450 km (0.901 mi)
  - Width: 0.400 km (0.249 mi)

Population (2022)
  - Total: 452
- Time zone: UTC+05:00 (MST)

Vaadhoo (Dhivehi: ވާދޫ) is one of the inhabited islands of Raa Atoll, Maldives.

Located at the southern tip of Raa Atoll, Vaadhoo is known for its coral reef, deep lagoon, and seasonally changing beaches. The local economy relies on fishing, palm weaving led by indigenous women, and agriculture focused on breadfruit and coconuts. Tourism flourishes due to the bioluminescent "Sea of Stars" and activities such as snorkeling, diving, kayaking, and fishing, allowing both residents and visitors to experience the island’s diverse environment. The integration of traditional crafts and sustainable tourism makes Vaadhoo an economic and ecological leader in the region.

== Geography ==
Vaadhoo is located in the Southern part of the country and is the second inhabited island in Raa Atoll. In Raa Atoll, it is located at the south end of the largest reef. Geographically, the island is located at Longitude 72.991073 and Latitude5.855380.The island is 194.46 km (121 mi; 105 nmi) north of the country's capital, Malé.

The island reef is one of the largest in the atoll which includes a deep water lagoon and vast area of shallow water. At the north of the reef is a deep lagoon with a depth of 20 to 30 meters on average.

=== Ecology ===
==== Bioluminescence ====
Vaadhoo island is famous for its glowing beaches, commonly termed the Sea of Stars. This marine bioluminescence is typically attributed to phytoplankton or dinoflagellates. Those creatures only emit brief flashes of light lasting less than a second, so ostracods have been credited as the source of longer-duration glow. However, because the individual microorganisms do not all flash simultaneously, the combined emission from clumped microorganisms appears continuous.

== Demography ==
Total population of the island was more than 500 in 2007.

Historical population
Year	Pop.	±%
2006	320	—
2014	375	+17.2%
2022	452	+20.5%
2006-2014-2022: Census populations Source:

== Economy ==
=== Agriculture ===
Agriculture is the third-largest industry. Over ten percent of the population works in this field. Historically, agriculture has been restricted to a few subsistence crops, including coconut, banana, breadfruit, papayas, mangoes, watermelon, taro, betel, chilies, sweet potatoes, tomatoes, and onions, due to poor soil and a lack of arable land. Still, Vaadhoo soil is best suited for breadfruit, water apple, and coconuts.

=== Fishing ===
Fishing is one of the biggest industries. Thirty-five percent of workers are employed in this industry. 4.5 metric tons of fish are caught on average per month. The majority of the extra fish that is consumed on a daily basis is prepared and sold to Capital Island (Male’). Fish for the proposed project can be continuously supplied by the current industry.

=== Palm Weaving (Fanvinun) ===
Over half of the island's women work in palm weaving, which is the second-largest business. In the nation's tourism industry, palm weaving techniques are a well-known product. It's a historic commodity that's used to construct traditional houses. The product is currently being used to construct tourist attractions that resemble traditional huts. Now, Over 10,000 bundles are being produced annually on the island and marketed to vacation spots.

=== Animal Harvesting ===
Rabbits and chickens are among the few animals that are harvested. Still, the island's industry continues to grow. Therefore, rabbits and chicken eggs are the main products.

=== Fiberglass Industry ===
This industry is expanding quickly on the island. According to particular demands, many kinds of fiberglass products are made, including speed boats to home items. Speed boats, cannon, water sports gear, and indigenous drums (Boduberu) manufacturing are all major parts of industry.

=== Handcrafting ===
The locals have many years of experience making souvenirs for tourists. However, commercial production of products is rare.

== Tourism ==
Vaadhoo is a perfect place for snorkeling, fishing trips, island hopping adventures and sandbank excursions. Because Vaadhoo has guesthouses and small-scale tourism, many tourists stay in locally run guesthouses or take day trips from nearby resorts and islands.

As the island is famous for its bioluminescent beaches, there are many activities available such as bioluminescent boat tours, Night snorkeling tours and private beach dinners. The best time to see the 'Sea of Stars' is during the late summer and early autumn, from June to October. New-moon nights when the sky is the darkest is when the water glows the brightest, and the eastern beach of the island is the ideal spot for the view.

Regarding the weather of the island, the dry season which is from November to April has clear weather but the ‘Sea of Stars’ will not be the brightest during this season. The wet season starting from May to October, the glow might be more visible in spite of the frequent rains. Before travelling to Vaadhoo, visitors are advised to check conditions with local guides or their accommodation for the best experience.

Vaadhoo in the Maldives is developing sustainable, community-based tourism that balances visitor interest with the preservation of local culture and natural environment. To protect the ecosystem of the island, local fishermen act as guides for the bioluminescence tours and craftsmen share their traditional handicrafts. The community has also launched a solar charging station for electric vehicles, reducing reliance on fossil-fuel transport and promoting green energy use. These efforts help maintain the Sea of Stars and foster responsible tourism practices.

== Sports ==
=== Scuba diving ===
Scuba diving is widely conducted around Vaadhoo Island due to its coral reefs, shipwrecks, and diverse marine fauna. Commonly observed species include reef fish, rays, sharks, and sea turtles. Night diving is also practiced, allowing divers to observe bioluminescent organisms under low-light conditions. The period from January to April generally provides the most favorable conditions, with calm seas and high visibility. The southern area of the island is commonly used for diving because of its deeper and more varied reef structures.

=== Kayaking ===
Kayaking is undertaken along the island’s coastline and is used to observe shoreline features and marine life. Night kayaking is occasionally practiced to view bioluminescent plankton on the water’s surface. Weather from May to October is typically suitable for kayaking due to relatively stable and clear conditions.

=== Snorkeling ===
Snorkeling is a widely accessible activity on Vaadhoo Island, allowing individuals to view coral formations, fish species, and phytoplankton in shallow waters. Nighttime snorkeling provides an alternative way to observe bioluminescence as light reflects off surface movements. Conditions from January to April are generally preferred for snorkeling. The northern side of the island, characterized by shallow near-shore waters, is the primary location for this activity.

=== Fishing ===
Fishing is commonly practiced on Vaadhoo Island and can be undertaken both during the day and at night. Species frequently caught include grouper, snapper, and tuna. The months from November to March are considered the most favorable due to increased fish activity. The western side of the island, noted for its deeper open waters, is a typical fishing site.
