= Lhaimagu =

Lhaimagu ޅައިމަގު
- Inhabited island
- Location in Maldives
- Coordinates: 06°09′45″N 73°15′00″E
- Country: Maldives
- Geographic atoll: Miladhummadulhu Atoll
- Administrative atoll: Shaviyani Atoll
- Distance to Malé: 221.62 km (137.71 mi)

Government
  - Local Council President: Adam Azmeer

Dimensions
  - Length: 0.850 km (0.528 mi)
  - Width: 0.630 km (0.391 mi)

Population (2022)
  - Total: 684
- Time zone: UTC+05:00 (MST)

Lhaimagu (Dhivehi: ޅައިމަގު) is one of the inhabited islands of the Shaviyani Atoll administrative division and geographically part of the Miladhummadulhu Atoll in the Maldives.

== History ==
Lhaimagu is well known among the Maldivian for Lhaimagu Faqeeraa, who is a mystic supposed to be from Lhaimagu. He is most famously mentioned in the folklore of Dhonhiyala aaie Alifulhu.

Another legendary figure is Hadheebee Kamanaa to whom is dedicated Hadheebee Magu and Hadheebee mosque in Male'.

== Geography ==
The island is 221.62 km (138 mi; 120 nmi) north of the country's capital, Malé.

The island is considered a medium-sized island by Maldive standards, measuring 850 metres (930 yd) by 603 metres (659 yd).

== Demography ==
Historical population
| Year | Pop. | ±% |
|---|---|---|
| 2006 | 529 | — |
| 2014 | 562 | +6.2% |
| 2022 | 684 | +21.7% |
2006-2014-2022: Census populations Source:

== Transport ==
A dhoni ride from the capital Male' could take approximately 10 hours, while a speedboat would take about 3 hours to reach the island.
