= MAPS College =

College in the Maldives

Coordinates: 4.173761°N 73.515951°E

- Other names: MAPS Institute
- Former names: Modern Academy for Professional Studies
- Type: Private educational institution
- Established: 1999; 27 years ago
- Location: Janavaree Magu, Malé, Maldives

MAPS College (formerly the MAPS Institute or the Modern Academy for Professional Studies) is a private educational institution located in Janavaree Magu, Malé, Maldives.

== MAPS College ==
The college was founded in 1999, and awarded college status in 2011. It provides post-secondary courses in accounting, finance, management, hospitality, and technology. In 2011, the institution moved to a new campus.

The college is operated by MAPS Maldives Private Ltd, a subsidiary of the FALIM Group.

== MAPS International High ==
MAPS International High is a senior high school that was established in 2011 by MAPS College. It accepts students in grades 11 and 12, and offers GCE Advanced Level training and Edexcel Alevel and Edexcel International Diplomas.
