= Centre for Higher Secondary Education Hulhumalé =

Higher Secondary school in Hulhumalé, Maldives

Coordinates: 4.220746°N 73.541780°E

Centre For Higher Secondary Education Hulhumalé
- ސެންޓަރ ފޮރ ހަޔަރ ސެކަންޑަރީ އެޑިޔުކޭޝަން ހުޅުމާލެ

Location
- Kurikeela Magu; Hulhumalé; Malé; Maldives

Information
- Type: Higher Secondary
- Motto: Each one, Teach one
- Opened: 6 August 2023
- Principal: Zuhudul Haqqu
- Houses: Ranmuiy, Feeroz, Asrafee, Yagooth
- Colour: Dark Blue
- Website: chse.edu.mv
- Last updated: 3 September 2026

Centre for Higher Secondary Education Hulhumalé (Dhivehi: ސެންޓަރ ފޮރ ހަޔަރ ސެކަންޑަރީ އެޑިޔުކޭޝަން ހުޅުމާލެ), more commonly known as CHSE-Hulhumalé (Dhivehi: ސީއެޗްއެސްއީ ހުޅުމާލެ), is the Hulhumalé branch of the Centre for Higher Secondary Education.

== History ==
CHSE-Hulhumalé came into being in 2020 after CHSE moved from its original building in Malé, citing not enough space to accommodate new students. It was met with criticism by the current minister of education, Ismail Shafeeu, citing challenges for students living in Malé to travel to Hulhumalé. It was first opened in 2023.

In 2024, the Ministry of Education later re-opened the CHSE building in Malé, being named CHSE-Malé and the Hulhumalé building to CHSE-Hulhumalé.

In July 2024, a special area dedicated for praying was opened in the CHSE building in Hulhumale'.
