= Komandoo (Shaviyani Atoll) =

Komandoo ކޮމަންޑޫ
- Inhabited island
- Location in Maldives
- Coordinates: 06°03′20″N 73°03′15″E
- Country: Maldives
- Geographic atoll: Miladhummadulhu Atoll
- Administrative atoll: Shaviyani Atoll
- Distance to Malé: 213.95 km (132.94 mi)

Dimensions
  - Length: 0.360 km (0.224 mi)
  - Width: 0.260 km (0.162 mi)

Population (2022)
  - Total: 921
- Time zone: UTC+05:00 (MST)

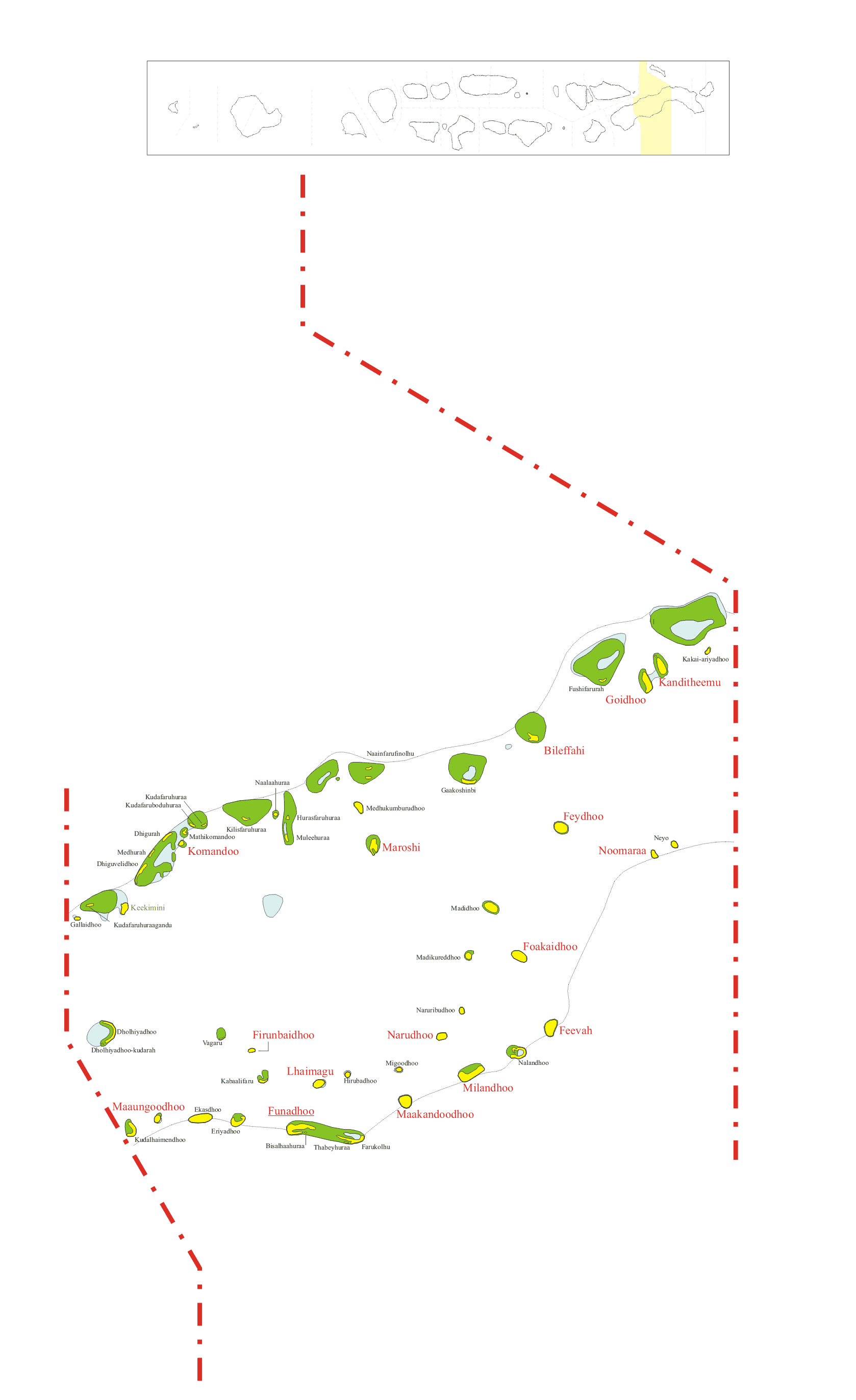

Komandoo (Dhivehi: ކޮމަންޑޫ) is one of the inhabited islands of the Shaviyani Atoll administrative division and geographically part of the North Miladhummadulhu Atoll in the Maldives.

== History ==
Early citizens lived in komandoo are from shaviyani atoll Mathi komandoo and Keekimini. There is no such proof but in both the island there are ruins of old houses and wells. It is said that Komandoo people firstly lived in Keekimini but to get rid of invaders they moved to Mathi komandoo. Then from Mathi komandoo to Komandoo. There are few historical artifacts and grave stones that shows skills of komandoo people.

== Geography ==
Komandoo is one of the islands of Shaviyanil Atoll. Situated 213.95 km (133 mi; 116 nmi) north of the country's capital, Malé, the island measures 315 yd (288 m) in length and 250 m (270 yd) in width. Komandoo has an area of about 9 ha (22 acres).

== Demography ==
Historical population
Year	Pop.	±%
2006	1,333	—
2014	1,063	−20.3%
2022	921	−13.4%
2006-2014: Census populations Source:

It is the third most populated island in Shaviyani Atoll with a current population of about 1,900 people.

== Services ==
=== Education ===
Shaviyani Atoll Education Centre is the biggest school in the atoll. Students can join at grade 1 at the age of 7 years and complete their A’ Levels at the end of their 12th grade at this school. Those students doing A’ Levels can complete Commerce and science stream for their studies at Shaviyani Atoll Education Centre. The biggest Teacher Training Center is in Komandoo.

=== Healthcare ===
Services provided by the Health Center include blood transfusion, E.C.G, laboratory investigations and family planning.

=== Other services ===
Other services available in Komandoo include speed boat rental services, Wireless internet connection, and cable TV service.

== Community ==
Komandoo is one of the special islands in the Maldives. There are 3 community associations including PSA(Past Students Association), AKYD(Komandoo Youth Development Association) and KMG(Komandoo Fishermens Association). They have special things uncommon to other islands. Komandoo have their own facilities including electricity, TV.station, desalination water plant, FM radio, slipway and their own phone network.
