= Kulhudhuffushi =

Capital of Haa Dhaalu Atoll, Maldives

Kulhudhuffushi ކުޅުދުއްފުށި
- City
- Kulhudhuffushi City
- Location in Maldives
- Coordinates: 6°37′21.04″N 73°4′12.9″E
- Country: Maldives
- Geographic atoll: Thiladhummathi Atoll
- Administrative atoll: Haa Dhaalu Atoll
- Distance to Malé: 274.96 km (170.85 mi)

Government
  - Type: Mayor–council government
  - Body: Kulhudhuffushi City Council
  - Mayor: Mohamed Athif (MDP)

Dimensions
  - Length: 2.900 km (1.802 mi)
  - Width: 1.800 km (1.118 mi)

Population (2022)
  - Total: 10,131
- Time zone: UTC+05:00 (MST)
- Website: kulhudhuffushicity.gov.mv

Kulhudhuffushi (Dhivehi: ކުޅުދުއްފުށި) is the capital of Haa Dhaalu Atoll administrative division on Thiladhunmathi Atoll in the north of the Maldives. Kulhudhuffushi City is known as the "Heart of the North.". This city is famous for its mangroves (Mashi Kulhi), after which the island itself is named.

== History ==
In the years 1812, 1819, and 1921, the island was affected by heavy rains and storms, causing substantial damage. The island was also affected during the Keylakunu storm which reduced the population of the island by half. Since then, the island has been famous for unity and hard workers around the Maldives. The ancient people of the island of Kulhudhuffushi were famous for their courage and bravery during the wars fought against the enemies of the nation. Apart from that, the people of Kulhudhuffushi City led the Thiladhunmathi Atoll in an act of rebellion against the Malé government during the 1940s because of the unjust governance for the people of the north at the time.

== Geography ==
The island is 274.96 km (171 mi; 148 nmi) north of the country's capital, Malé.

With an area of 300 hectares, Kulhudhuffushi is one of the largest and most populous islands in the northern part of the Maldives. The island itself is the administrative capital of the South Thiladhunmathi Atoll

=== Climate ===
Kulhudhuffushi has a tropical monsoon climate (Köppen: Am).

Climate data for Kulhudhuffushi
Month	Jan	Feb	Mar	Apr	May	Jun	Jul	Aug	Sep	Oct	Nov	Dec	Year
Mean daily maximum °C (°F)	27.4 (81.3)	27.7 (81.9)	28.4 (83.1)	29.0 (84.2)	28.8 (83.8)	28.4 (83.1)	28.1 (82.6)	27.9 (82.2)	27.8 (82.0)	27.8 (82.0)	27.7 (81.9)	27.6 (81.7)	28.1 (82.5)
Daily mean °C (°F)	26.9 (80.4)	27.2 (81.0)	27.9 (82.2)	28.3 (82.9)	28.0 (82.4)	27.7 (81.9)	27.4 (81.3)	27.3 (81.1)	27.1 (80.8)	27.1 (80.8)	27.0 (80.6)	27.0 (80.6)	27.4 (81.3)
Mean daily minimum °C (°F)	26.3 (79.3)	26.6 (79.9)	27.2 (81.0)	27.4 (81.3)	27.0 (80.6)	26.8 (80.2)	26.5 (79.7)	26.5 (79.7)	26.2 (79.2)	26.3 (79.3)	26.2 (79.2)	26.3 (79.3)	26.6 (79.9)
Average precipitation mm (inches)	48.6 (1.91)	33.0 (1.30)	41.0 (1.61)	82.0 (3.23)	230.2 (9.06)	157.8 (6.21)	153.8 (6.06)	159.3 (6.27)	184.5 (7.26)	195.5 (7.70)	183.7 (7.23)	140.8 (5.54)	1,610.2 (63.38)
Source: Weather.Directory

== Transport ==
=== Kulhudhuffushi Airport ===
Kulhudhuffushi Airport (IATA: HDK, ICAO: VRBK) Is in operation since August 2019 and has been serving the island ever since.

=== Bus service ===
MTCC, RTL bus service is in operation in maldives since September 28,2023

== Demography ==
Historical population
Year	Pop.	±%
2006	6,998	—
2014	8,226	+17.5%
2022	10,131	+23.2%
2006-2014-2022: Census populations Source:

== Economy ==
Kulhudhuffushi City is the economic capital of the northern Maldives. Residents of the city and surrounding settlements are mostly employed in the service or produce sectors, such as the local Saturday Market. The Saturday market is a market that is held every Saturday at "Bandaara Road" in Kulhudhuffushi, where local farmer's products and domestic food are available. Hundreds of islanders of Thiladhunmathi visit for shopping and business to Kulhudhuffushi City mostly on Saturdays.

People from the island are known and famous for shark fishing, blacksmithing, producing coir rope, building boats, and working in cargo vessels. The culture of the island has its uniqueness until now.

== Education ==
H.Dh Kulhudhuffushi includes 3 schools that provide primary education.

No.	Island	Name	Grades	Founded
1	Kulhudhuffushi	H.Dh Atoll Education Centre / AEC	Primary School, Grades 1–10, and also Kindergarten (between age 4–6)	1 March 1979
2	Kulhudhuffushi	Afeefuddin School	Primary School, Grades 1 – 10, and also Kindergarten (between age 4–6)	25 April 2004
3	Kulhudhuffushi	Jalaluddin School	Secondary School, Grades 1 – 12	15 February 1998
4	Kulhudhuffushi	Maldivian National University Campus	Certificate level to PhD	2003
5	Kulhudhuffushi	Villa College Campus	Certificate level to Masters	2007
6	Kulhudhuffushi	MI College Campus	Certificate level to Bachelor Degree	2012

== Health ==
Kulhudhuffushi Regional Hospital is an A-category hospital that serves the residents of the island and the islands of the region.The Hospital has been operating since 1982.

== Sport ==
Azneem Ahmed qualified for the 100-meter sprint in the 2012 London Olympics. Kulhudhuffushi is regarded as the basketball champion of the Maldives. Adam Ismail was a footballer during the late 1950s at the time when the Maldives got independence and started playing international football and also a martial artist. Football is the most widely played sport, and the island holds the highest number of quality football grounds around the nation, except Male'. The national 2015 President's Cup Group A matches were held in Kulhudhuffushi.

== Notable residents ==
- Azneem Ahmed – An Olympic sprinter who holds three national records.
- Corporal Hussain Adam – A Maldivian soldier who died while defending the Maldives National Defense Force headquarters during the 1988 Maldives coup d'état on 3 November 1988
- Adam Ismail—A sportsperson and huge role model for the youth. He played as a captain of the Maldivian national team in the first international match played by Maldives against Queen Elizabeth during Ibrahim Nasir's era. He was also a gymnastics teacher and a football coach during his time.
