= Maamigili =

Maamigili may refer to the following places in the Republic of Maldives:

- Maamigili (Alif Dhaal Atoll)
- Maamigili (Raa Atoll)
