= Memnon (disambiguation) =

Memnon was a king of Ethiopia in Greek mythology.

Memnon may also refer to:

== Given name ==
- Memnon of Rhodes (380–333 BC), commander of the Greek mercenaries working for the Persian King Darius III
- Memnon of Thrace, Macedonian governor of Thrace who led a rebellion in 332 BC – see Antipater
- Memnon of Heraclea, 1st or 2nd century Greek historian
- Saint Memnon the Wonderworker, 2nd century Christian saint from Egypt, hermit and hegumen of one of Egyptian monasteries
- Memnon, ward of Herodes Atticus in Athens in the 2nd century AD
- Saint Memnon the Centurion, martyred c. 305 - see August 23 (Eastern Orthodox liturgics)
- Memnon of Ephesus, a fifth century bishop of Ephesus who took part in the Nestorian controversy
- Younger Memnon, bust of Ramesses II in British Museum
- Colossi of Memnon, two large stone statues of the Pharaoh Amenhotep III

== Ships ==
- INS Memnon
- Memnon (clipper), the first clipper ship to reach San Francisco during the Gold Rush
- MV Memnon, a cargo ship sunk by a U-boat on 11 March 1941

== Other uses ==
- Memnon (horse), early 19th century British Thoroughbred racehorse
- Memnon (novel) by Scott Oden, based on Memnon of Rhodes
- Memnon – Histoire orientale, the original title of Voltaire's novella Zadig; or, The Book of Fate
- Memnon, a play by Will Power
- Memnon, the main villain in the film The Scorpion King
- 2895 Memnon, an asteroid

== See also ==
- Colossi of Memnon, two statues of Pharaoh Amenhotep III near modern-day Luxor
- Younger Memnon, one of two colossal statues of Ramesses II from the Ramesseum at Thebes, Egypt
