= List of shipwrecks in August 1843 =

The list of shipwrecks in August 1843 includes ships sunk, foundered, wrecked, grounded or otherwise lost during August 1843.

== 1 August ==
List of shipwrecks: 1 August 1843
Ship	State	Description
Bunbury	United Kingdom	The ship ran aground on the Haaks Bank, in the North Sea off the Dutch coast. She was on a voyagef rom Newport, Monmouthshire to Hamburg. She was refloated and taken into the Nieuw Diep.
Memnon	United Kingdom	The British East India Company's steam frigate was wrecked off Cape Guardafui, Majerteen Sultanate. All 170 passengers, and her crew, were rescued. She was on a voyage from Bombay, India to Suez, Egypt.
Rosalind	United Kingdom	The ship was lost whilst on a voyage from Rio de Janeiro, Brazil to Montevideo, Uruguay. Her crew were rescued.
Wales	United States	The ship was wrecked on Burias Island, Spanish East Indies. Her crew were rescued. She was on a voyage from Manila, Spanish East Indies to New York.
William Thompson	United Kingdom	The brig was wrecked 35 to 40 nautical miles (65 to 74 km) west of the Arab's Tower, Egypt.

== 3 August ==
List of shipwrecks: 3 August 1843
Ship	State	Description
Dove	United Kingdom	The ship was driven ashore near "Bratten", Denmark. She was on a voyage from Stettin to London. She was refloated and resumed her voyage.
Sheraton	United Kingdom	The ship was driven ashore on the Nakkehead, Denmark. She was on a voyage from Newcastle upon Tyne, Northumberland to Saint Petersburg, Russia. She was refloated and resumed her voyage.

== 4 August ==
List of shipwrecks: 4 August 1843
Ship	State	Description
Broughton	United Kingdom	The ship ran aground on the Upgang Rock, off the coast of Yorkshire. She was refloated.
Cacilda	United Kingdom	The ship capsized at Ramsgate, Kent and was damaged. She was on a voyage from London to Lisbon, Portugal.
Dove	United Kingdom	The ship ran aground near "Bratten", Denmark. She was on a voyage from Stettin to London.
Fanny	United Kingdom	The ship was driven ashore at Cooke's Point, County Limerick.
Lady Emily	United Kingdom	The ship was driven ashore in the Magdalen Islands, Nova Scotia, British North America. She was on a voyage from Dalhousie, New Brunswick, British North America to Sunderland, County Durham.
Meteor	United Kingdom	The ship was wrecked on the Bocas. She was on a voyage from Trinidad to London.
Water Lily	United Kingdom	The ship foundered in the North Sea. Her crew were rescued by Andes (United Kingdom). She was on a voyage from Seaham, County Durham to Saint Petersburg, Russia.

== 6 August ==
List of shipwrecks: 6 August 1843
Ship	State	Description
Arkwright	United Kingdom	The full-rigged ship was wrecked near the mouth of the São Francisco River with the loss of all hands. She was on a voyage from Bahia, Brazil to London.
Empire; Omen	United States; United Kingdom	Empire collided with the brig Omen at Blankenese. Both vessels ran aground but were subsequently refloated and taken into Cuxhaven.
John	United Kingdom	The ship was driven ashore at Wells-next-the-Sea, Norfolk. She was on a voyage from York to Wells-next-the-Sea. She was refloated and taken into port.
Relief	United Kingdom	The sloop was abandoned off Sanda Head, Argyllshire. She was on a voyage from Troon, Ayrshire to Sligo.
Shelmalier	United Kingdom	The ship ran aground on the Long Bank, in the Irish Sea off the coast of County Wexford. She was refloated the next day.

== 7 August ==
List of shipwrecks: 7 August 1843
Ship	State	Description
Lady Falkland	United Kingdom	The ship was wrecked on the Belfast Reef, off Antigua. She was on a voyage from Liverpool, Lancashire to Santa Marta, Republic of New Granada.

== 8 August ==
List of shipwrecks: 8 August 1843
Ship	State	Description
Caclida	United Kingdom	The ship capsized at Ramsgate, Kent. She was on a voyage from London to Lisbon, Portugal.
Ceylon	United States	The ship was driven ashore at Guanabo, Cuba. She was refloated the next day and taken into Havana.
Delphine	Netherlands	The ship capsized off Bathurst, Gambia Colony and Protectorate with the loss of five lives. She was on a voyage from Banjul to Goree, Zeeland.
Isis	United Kingdom	The ship ran aground on Hamilton's Bank, in the Solent. She was on a voyage from Portsmouth, Hampshire to Nantes, Loire-Inférieure, France. She was refloated and resumed her voyage.
Mary	United Kingdom	The schooner foundered off Oxwich Bay. Her crew were rescued. She was on a voyage from Cardiff, Glamorgan to Portreath, Cornwall.
Zephyr	Norway	The schooner was driven ashore at South Foreland, Kent. She was on a voyage from Bergen to Bilbao, Spain. She was refloated and resumed her voyage.

== 10 August ==
List of shipwrecks: 10 August 1843
Ship	State	Description
NRP Liberal	Portuguese Navy	The schooner sprang a leak and foundered in the Atlantic Ocean (19°55′N 24°55′W). All 49 people on board were rescued by the barque Sir John Beresford (United Kingdom). NRP Liberal was on a voyage from Angola to Lisbon.
Mercy	(United Kingdom of Great Britain and Ireland) British North America	The ship was in collision with Mary and foundered in the Atlantic Ocean (45°43′N 56°14′W). Her crew were rescued.

== 11 August ==
List of shipwrecks: 11 August 1843
Ship	State	Description
Jane	(United Kingdom of Great Britain and Ireland) Jersey	The ship was driven ashore at Arichat, Nova Scotia, British North America. She had been refloated by 11 September.
San Francisco	Kingdom of the Two Sicilies	The ship ran aground on the Schielbock Bank, in the North Sea off the Dutch coast. She was on a voyage from Rotterdam, South Holland, Netherlands to Naples. She was refloated and put into Hellevoetsluis, Zeeland, Netherlands.
Traube	Hamburg	The ship ran aground in the Elbe twice and also on the Mewensand. She was on a voyage from Hamburg to Hull, Yorkshire, United Kingdom. Traube put into Cuxhaven.

== 12 August ==
List of shipwrecks: 12 August 1843
Ship	State	Description
Ann	United Kingdom	The ship ran aground and was damaged at North Shields, County Durham. She was on a voyage from Licata, Sicily to North Shields.
Buchan	United Kingdom	The ship was driven ashore at Peterhead, Aberdeenshire. She was refloated and put back to Peterhead.
John Berry	United Kingdom	The ship foundered in the North Sea off Tynemouth, Northumberland. Her crew were rescued. She was on a voyage from Aberdeen to London.

== 13 August ==
List of shipwrecks: 13 August 1843
Ship	State	Description
Princess Royal	United Kingdom	The paddle steamer ran aground off the Point of Ayr, Isle of Man. She was on a voyage from Glasgow, Renfrewshire to Liverpool, Lancashire. She was refloated.
Tweedside	United Kingdom	The paddle steamer was driven ashore at Hendon, County Durham. She was on a voyage from Hartlepool to Sunderland. She was later refloated and taken into Sunderland.
Zunia	France	The brig ran aground on the Goodwin Sands, Kent, United Kingdom. She was on a voyage from Saint-Malo, Ille-et-Vilaine to South Shields, County Durham, United Kingdom. She was refloated and taken into the English Channel.

== 14 August ==
List of shipwrecks: 14 August 1843
Ship	State	Description
Friends	United Kingdom	The ship ran aground on the Whitton Sand and capsized. She was on a voyage from Goole, Yorkshire to Wisbech, Cambridgeshire.
Louis Philippe	France	The ship was driven ashore at Staithes, Yorkshire. She was refloated.

== 15 August ==
List of shipwrecks: 15 August 1843
Ship	State	Description
Margaret	United Kingdom	The ship was driven ashore and wrecked at Thurso, Caithness. She was on a voyage from Inverness to Thurso.
Speculation	United Kingdom	The ship foundered in the North Sea 6 German miles 24.41 nautical miles (45.20 km) off Heligoland. Her crew were rescued. She was on a voyage from "Welforde" to Hull, Yorkshire.

== 16 August ==
List of shipwrecks: 16 August 1843
Ship	State	Description
Chester	United Kingdom	The ship was driven ashore near New York, United States. She was on a voyage from Liverpool, Lancashire to New York. She was refloated on 22 September and taken into New York for repairs.
Maine	Hamburg	The ship ran aground on the Ostriff. She was on a voyage from Hamburg to Rouen, Seine-Inférieure, France. She was refloated and Put into Cuxhaven in a severely leaky condition.

== 17 August ==
List of shipwrecks: 17 August 1843
Ship	State	Description
Governor Hebson	(United Kingdom of Great Britain and Ireland) New South Wales	The ship was wrecked off Table Cape, Van Diemen's Land with the loss of all hands.
Shipwright	United Kingdom	The ship was driven ashore in the River Blackwater.

== 18 August ==
List of shipwrecks: 18 August 1843
Ship	State	Description
Hartlepool	United Kingdom	The ship was driven ashore south of "Cronsloft", Russia. She was on a voyage from Shoreham-by-Sea, Sussex to Saint Petersburg, Russia.
Henry	United States	The barque was driven ashore at Staithes, Yorkshire, United Kingdom. She was refloated with assistance from the steamship Streanshalgh and a number of fishing boats (all United Kingdom).
Ida	Netherlands	The ship ran aground on the Goodwin Sands, Kent, United Kingdom. She was on a voyage from Torrevecchia Teatina, Papal States to Rotterdam, South Holland. She was refloated and resumed her voyage.
Town of Wexford	United Kingdom	The steamship ran aground at Wexford. She was later refloated.

== 19 August ==
List of shipwrecks: 19 August 1843
Ship	State	Description
Abiezer	United Kingdom	The brig was destroyed by fire at Topping's Wharf, Southwark, Surrey.
Agnes and Barbara	United Kingdom	The ship sank in the English Channel off the Nab Lightship ( Trinity House). Her crew were rescued. She was on a voyage from Guernsey, Channel Islands to London.
Cornwall	United Kingdom	The schooner was damaged by fire at Topping's Wharf.
Daniel O'Connell	United Kingdom	The ship foundered in the Bristol Channel. Her crew were rescued.
Dublin Lass	United Kingdom	The ship was damaged by fire at Topping's Wharf.
Emily	United Kingdom	The ship ran aground at the entrance to the Dardanelles. She was on a voyage from Smyrna, Ottoman Empire to Trieste. She was refloated on 29 August and taken into Tenedos, Ottoman Empire.
Fleece	United Kingdom	The schooner was damaged by fire at Topping's Wharf.
Merchant	United States	The barque was run down and sunk by Acadia (United Kingdom). Her crew were rescued by Acadia. Merchant was on a voyage from Amsterdam, North Holland, Netherlands to Quebec City, Province of Canada, British North America.
Theisa	United Kingdom	The ship was damaged by fire at Topping's Wharf.
Veloz	Spain	The ship was driven ashore at Algeciras. She was on a voyage from Málaga to Havana, Cuba. She was refloated.

== 20 August ==
List of shipwrecks: 20 August 1843
Ship	State	Description
Gezina Jantina	Hamburg	The ship was driven ashore on the Praa Sands, Cornwall, United Kingdom. She was on a voyage from Newport, Monmouthshire, United Kingdom to Hamburg. She was refloated on 21 August and taken into Penzance, Cornwall.
Margaret	United Kingdom	The steamship struck a sunken rock in the Sound of Mull and was holed. She was assisted into Oban, Argyllshire. She was on a voyage from Hull, Yorkshire to Liverpool, Lancashire.
Reliance	(United Kingdom of Great Britain and Ireland) Bermuda	The brig was driven ashore and wrecked on Egg Island, New Jersey, United States. Her crew were rescued. She was on a voyage from St. Jago de Cuba, Cuba to Halifax, Nova Scotia, British North America.

== 21 August ==
List of shipwrecks: 21 August 1843
Ship	State	Description
Thistle	United Kingdom	The ship foundered between Caldy Island and St Margaret's Island, Pembrokeshire. Her crew were rescued. She was on a voyage from Great Yarmouth, Norfolk to Saundersfoot, Pembrokeshire.

== 22 August ==
List of shipwrecks: 22 August 1843
Ship	State	Description
Commerce	United Kingdom	The ship was driven ashore and wrecked at Seatown, Dorset with the loss of a crew member.
Friends	(United Kingdom of Great Britain and Ireland) Isle of Man	The ship ran aground on the North Wharf Bank, in the Irish Sea off the coast of Lancashire. She was refloated and towed into Fleetwood, Lancashire in a sinking condition.
Good Intent	United Kingdom	The ship capsized off Spurn Point, Yorkshire with the loss of three of her crew. She was on a voyage from the Humber to Louth, Lincolnshire. Good Intent was subsequently taken into Grimsby, Lincolnshire.
Leander	United Kingdom	The brig ran aground on the Barber Sand, in the North Sea off the coast of Norfolk. She was on a voyage from South Shields, County Durham to Naples, Kingdom of the Two Sicilies. She was refloated an put back to South Shields for repairs.
Lydia	Flag unknown	The ship was lost at the mouth of the Ems. She was on a voyage from Danzig to Emden, Kingdom of Hanover.
Ovid	United Kingdom	The schooner was driven ashore on Texel, North Holland, Netherlands. She was on a voyage from Amsterdam, North Holland to Sunderland, County Durham.
Owen Glendower	United Kingdom	The ship was driven ashore west of Pwllheli, Caernarfonshire. She was on a voyage from Great Yarmouth, Norfolk to Liverpool, Lancashire. She was refloated on 27 August and taken into Pwllheli.

== 23 August ==
List of shipwrecks: 23 August 1843
Ship	State	Description
Bencoolen	United Kingdom	The ship ran aground in the River Thames. She was on a voyage from Bombay, India to London. She was refloated and taken into port.
Bolivar	United Kingdom	The ship was abandoned in the Atlantic Ocean 40 nautical miles (74 km) south west of Cape St. Antonio, Portugal. Her nineteen crew were rescued by Adastrus (United Kingdom). Bolivar was on a voyage from Sierra Leone to Falmouth, Cornwall.
Carpenter	United Kingdom	The ship was driven ashore at Nidingen, Sweden. She was on a voyage from Danzig to Newcastle upon Tyne, Northumberland. She was refloated on 26 August and put into Gothenburg for repairs.
Emilie Gabrielle	France	The ship ran aground on Company's Island Reef. She was on a voyage from Saint Domingo to Aux Cayes, Haiti. She was refloated and taken in to Flamand's Bay, where she was condemned.
Globe	United Kingdom	The ship was driven ashore at Redcar, Yorkshire. She was refloated.
Merchant	United States	The barque was driven ashore on Sable Island, Nova Scotia, British North America.
Sir William Wallace	United Kingdom	The ship was lost in the Pentland Firth with the loss of all but one of her crew. She was on a voyage from Saint Petersburg, Russia to Liverpool, Lancashire.
St. Ann's	United Kingdom	The barque ran aground on the West Spit, at the mouth of the River Medway.
Tenerife	United Kingdom	The ship was severely damaged by fire at London.

== 24 August ==
List of shipwrecks: 24 August 1843
Ship	State	Description
Edward Franklin	United States	The ship departed from New Bedford, Massachusetts for Philadelphia, Pennsylvania. No further trace, presumed foundered in the Atlantic Ocean with the loss of all hands.
Sankari	(Russian Empire) Grand Duchy of Finland	The ship ran aground off "Trindelen", Sweden. Her crew were rescued. She was on a voyage from Cette, Hérault, France to Oulu. She was later refloated.

== 25 August ==
List of shipwrecks: 25 August 1843
Ship	State	Description
Prince Albert	United Kingdom	The ship was wrecked in Plattenburgh Bay.
Princess Augusta	(United Kingdom of Great Britain and Ireland) British North America	The schooner capsized in the Atlantic Ocean 20 nautical miles (37 km) west of Cape Sable Island, Nova Scotia with the loss of all but one of her crew. The survivor was rescued by Margaret (United Kingdom). She was on a voyage from La Have to Halifax. She was subsequently towed into Castine, Maine, United States.

== 26 August ==
List of shipwrecks: 26 August 1843
Ship	State	Description
Delhi	United Kingdom	The ship was driven ashore and wrecked in Algoa Bay. Her crew were rescued.
Elizabeth Rowell	United Kingdom	The ship was driven ashore and wrecked in Algoa Bay. Her crew survived.
Glenburnie	United Kingdom	The barque collided with the full-rigged ship Lochliboo (United Kingdom) and sank off "Cape de Montez", British North America. Her crew were rescued.
Goldfinch	United Kingdom	The ship was driven ashore at Staithes, Yorkshire.
John and James	United Kingdom	The ship was wrecked at Danger Point, Cape Colony. Her crew were rescued. She was on a voyage from Calcutta, India to Saint Helena and London.
Laura	United Kingdom	The ship was driven ashore and wrecked in Algoa Bay with the loss of all hands.
USS Missouri	United States Navy	USS Missouri. The frigate, a paddle steamer, was destroyed by fire at Gibraltar. About 200 crew were rescued by HMS Malabar (Royal Navy).
Seagull	United Kingdom	The barque was driven ashore and wrecked in Algoa Bay with the loss of all fifteen crew.

== 27 August ==
List of shipwrecks: 27 August 1843
Ship	State	Description
Goldfish	United Kingdom	The brig was driven ashore at Staithes, Yorkshire.
Lord Lowther	United Kingdom	The East Indiaman was wrecked on the South Sands, in the Strait of Malacca, She was on a voyage from Bombay, India to China.
Margaret	United Kingdom	The ship ran aground and capsized off "Aizere", France.

== 28 August ==
List of shipwrecks: 28 August 1843
Ship	State	Description
Charlotte	(United Kingdom of Great Britain and Ireland) Van Diemen's Land	The ship, a cutter or sloop, was wrecked at Four Mile Creek with the loss of two of the nine people on board.
Customer	(United Kingdom of Great Britain and Ireland) British North America	The ship was wrecked on the Bull Rock, off Cape St. Mary's, Nova Scotia with the loss of a crew member. She was on a voyage from Lamaline, Newfoundland to St. John's, Newfoundland.
Pilot	United Kingdom	The ship was abandoned in the Bristol Channel. She was driven ashore at "Petestone". She was on a voyage from Cardiff, Glamorgan to Bristol, Gloucestershire.
Phœnix	United Kingdom	The steamship was driven ashore at "Tebor", Caernarvonshire. She was refloated the next day.
Zufriendheit	Stettin	The ship sprang a leak and sank 0.5 metres (1 ft 8 in) off the Skagen Lighthouse, Denmark. Her crew were rescued. She was on a voyage from Grangemouth, Stirlingshire, United Kingdom to Stettin.

== 29 August ==
List of shipwrecks: 29 August 1843
Ship	State	Description
Gannet	(United Kingdom of Great Britain and Ireland) New Zealand	The ship was wrecked on a reef off "Anoma", on the east coast of New Zealand. Her crew were rescued.

== 30 August ==
List of shipwrecks: 30 August 1843
Ship	State	Description
Ellen	(United Kingdom of Great Britain and Ireland) British North America	The ship was lost off "Marie Joseph". She was on a voyage from Halifax, Nova Scotia to Buctouche, New Brunswick.
Isabella	United Kingdom	The ship ran aground on the Tol Bank, in the English Channel off the French coast. She was refloated and resumed her voyage.
Martha	United Kingdom	The ship ran aground at Constantinople, Ottoman Empire. She was on a voyage from London to Constantinople. She was refloated.
Naiad	(United Kingdom of Great Britain and Ireland) New South Wales	The schooner was wrecked on a reef off Swan Island. All on board were rescued by the schooner Abeona ( (United Kingdom of Great Britain and Ireland) New South Wales).
Prudence Jean	France	The ship was driven ashore and wrecked at Cléder, Finistère. She was on a voyage from Rouen, Seine-Inférieure to Brest, Finistère.
St. Andrew	United Kingdom	The ship was destroyed by fire in the Irish Sea off the coast of County Waterford. Her crew survived. She was on a voyage from Liverpool, Lancashire to the Cape of Good Hope.
Tartar	United Kingdom	The ship was abandoned at sea. Her crew were rescued. She was on a voyage from Arkhangelsk, Russia to Hull, Yorkshire.

== Unknown date ==
List of shipwrecks: Unknown date in August 1843
Ship	State	Description
Byron	United States	The schooner was lost in the South Channel. It was lost with all hands, at least 9 crew.
Captain Cook	United Kingdom	The collier was wrecked on the coast of Africa 9 nautical miles (17 km) south east of "Burnt Island" before 21 August. Her crew were rescued by Midas (United Kingdom).
Luz	Spain	The brig was lost off "Sajona", Saint Domingo before 23 August.
Memphis	United States	The ship was driven ashore at Chicamacomico, South Carolina. She was on a voyage from New Orleans, Louisiana to New York. She was refloated and towed into the Hampton Roads, Virginia.
Rebecca	United Kingdom	The ship was wrecked in the Dry Tortugas before 23 August. She was on a voyage from British Honduras to New Orleans, Louisiana, United States.
Sun	United Kingdom	The ship was dismasted and abandoned in the Atlantic Ocean before 11 August.
William Thompson	United Kingdom	The ship was driven ashore at Alexandria, Egypt before 6 August. She was refloated on 16 September and taken into Alexandria.
