= Alifushi =

Alifushi އަލިފުށި
- Inhabited island
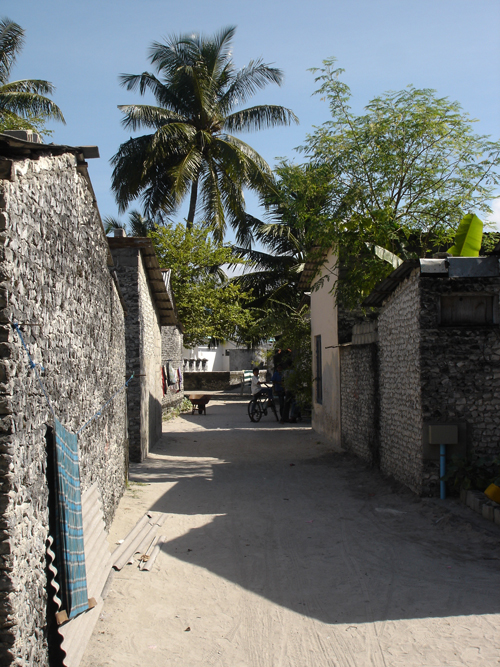
- The coral sand–covered streets of Alifushi

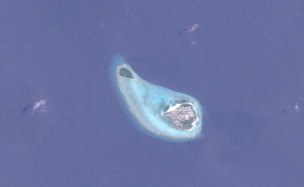
- Alifushi (right) and Eththingili

- Location in Maldives
- Coordinates: 5°58′02″N 72°57′12″E
- Country: Maldives
- Administrative atoll: Raa Atoll
- Distance to Malé: 207.43 km (128.89 mi)

Area
  - Total: 0.31 km^{2} (0.12 sq mi)

Dimensions
  - Length: 0.950 km (0.590 mi)
  - Width: 0.750 km (0.466 mi)

Population (2025)
  - Total: 3,044
  - Density: 9,800/km^{2} (25,000/sq mi)
- Time zone: UTC+05:00 (MST)

Alifushi (Dhivehi: އަލިފުށި) is an inhabited island in the Northern Maldives, administratively part of Raa Atoll (Northern Maalhosmadulu). Located isolated at the northernmost point of the atoll, it forms a small distinct geographic feature alongside its neighboring, uninhabited paired islet, Etthingili.

Together, Alifushi and Etthingili are historically known in Western cartography as the Powell Islands.

== History ==
=== Powell Islands Survey (1834–1836) ===
Alifushi and Etthingili were named the "Powell Islands" by Captain Robert Moresby during his hydrographic survey of the Atolls of the Maldives between 1834 and 1836. The islands were named in honor of Lieutenant F. F. Powell, an assistant surveyor on the expedition. Following his promotion to Captain, Powell led further trigonometrical surveys along the coast of Ceylon and the Palk Strait.

...and the ink of the Maldive charts had scarcely dried, when the labours of those employed were demanded of the Indian Government by Her Majesty’s authorities at Ceylon, to undertake trigonometrical surveys of that Island, and the dangerous and shallow gulfs on either side of the neck of sand connecting it with India. They were the present Captains F. F. Powell, and Richard Ethersey, in the Schooner 'Royal Tiger' and 'Shannon,' assisted by Lieut. (now Commander) Felix Jones, and the late Lieut. Wilmot Christopher, who fell in action before Mooltan. The first of these officers had charge of one of the tenders under Lieut. Powell, and the latter another under Lieut. Ethersey. The maps of the Pamban Pass and the Straits of Manaar were by the hand of Lieut. Felix Jones, who was the draftsman also on this survey: they speak for themselves.

— from Richard F. Burton's First Footsteps in East Africa.

== Economy ==
Alifushi is widely recognized throughout the Maldives as a major hub for traditional and modern naval craftsmanship.

- Boatbuilding (Dhoni Crafting): The island is famous for master boatyards producing traditional Maldivian dhonis, commercial fishing vessels, and modern fiberglass speedboats. Artisans combine centuries-old indigenous carpentry methods with contemporary engineering.
- Fishery & Agriculture: Pelagic tuna fishing and reef fishing constitute key local livelihoods alongside small-scale agriculture.

== Transport ==
The island is accessible via inter-atoll ferry services, private speedboats, or domestic flights connecting through regional airports within Raa Atoll (such as Ifuru Airport).

== Geography ==
Alifushi and Etthingili (Powell Islands in the Admiralty Chart) stand on a detached reef of their own with very deep waters (no sounding), between this isolated reef shelf and the northern end of the main Northern Maalhosmadulhu Atoll.

Alifushi is 207.43 km (129 mi; 112 nmi) north of the country's capital, Malé.

== Demography ==
Historical population
Year	Pop.	±%
2006	1,974	—
2014	1,578	−20.1%
2022	1,859	+17.8%
2006-2022: Census populations Source:

== Economy ==
This island is renowned for its carpenters and boat builders.
