= Dheburidheytherey Kandu =

Narrow water channel between two atolls

Dheburidheytherey Kandu is the narrow channel between Raa Atoll and Fasdhoothere segment of Baa Atoll of the Maldives.
