= Kandholhudhoo =

Kandholhudhoo may refer to two places in the Republic of Maldives:

- Kandholhudhoo (Alif Alif Atoll)
- Kandholhudhoo (Raa Atoll)
