= Dhuvaafaru =

Dhuvaafaru ދުވާފަރު
- Inhabited island
- Location in Maldives
- Coordinates: 05°37′42″N 73°02′30″E
- Country: Maldives
- Administrative atoll: Raa Atoll
- Distance to Malé: 168.83 km (104.91 mi)

Area
  - Total: 0.5416 km^{2} (0.2091 sq mi)

Dimensions
  - Length: 1.529 km (0.950 mi)
  - Width: 0.468 km (0.291 mi)

Population (2022)
  - Total: 3,321
  - Density: 6,132/km^{2} (15,880/sq mi)
- Time zone: UTC+05:00 (MST)

Dhuvaafaru (Dhivehi: ދުވާފަރު) is an inhabited island of Maldives located in the eastern edge of Raa Atoll. Resettlement of the island started on 14 December 2008 to inhabit the displaced residents of Kandholhudhoo (Raa Atoll) who were the victims of the 2004 Indian Ocean earthquake and tsunami.

The task of resettling the tsunami victims and establishing a new island community on Dhuvaafaru was undertaken by the International Federation of Red Cross and Red Crescent Societies (IFRC) under an agreement made with the Government of Maldives in May 2005. Though Dhuvaafaru was uninhabited until recent history, there is physical and literary proof of the island being inhabited over 200 years ago. The famous wartime hero Dhandahelu — depicted in story of Maldives independence war against Portuguese invasion in 16th Century — is named after this island and is referred to in the historical literature as Dhuvaafaru Dhandahelu (meaning Dhandahelu from Dhuvaafaru).

== History ==
=== Etymology ===
In the local Maldivian Dhivehi language, the island name of Dhuvaafaru is literally translated as "running reef". It is suggested that this name is derived from the because of the reef (Dhivehi: ފަރު) in the island's eastern side reef in the eastern side of the island in which the reef occasionally dries thus showing it's rocks it might be also may have been derived from the ever-shifting shape of the island's beach in different monsoons. Even today the shape of the beach and shoreline keeps changing consistently, especially during the rainy season.

=== Early history ===
There is historical evidence that Dhuvaafaru was populated around 15th Century and it may have been populated as late as 200 years ago. A famous associate of the Maldivian national hero Muhammad Thakurufaanu Al Auzam is from Dhuvaafaru. This associate is popularly known as Dhuvaafaru Dhandahelu. According to Maldivian historical sources, Dhuvaafaru Dhandahelu was a young boy from the island of Dhuvaafaru who fought with Muhammad Thakurufaanu Al Auzam to free Maldives from the occupation of Portuguese. In traditional stories Dhuvaafaru Dhandahelu is portrayed as a vigilant and valiant person.

In August 2005 an ancient area was discovered while trees were being cleared to make way for roads. This site sits on the south east side of the school. The cemetery, well and coral stone structure found from this location were officially protected as a place of historical significance.

It is believed that the previous residents of Dhuvaafaru, left the island due to soil erosion and its less proximity to fishing grounds. Some folktales claim that Dhuvaafaru was abandoned because the island was haunted. Elders of Kandholhudhoo claim that their ancestors were from Dhuvaafaru and other such islands across the atoll. They migrated to Kandholhudhoo because it was closer to the wider sea where fish is abundant.

=== Repopulation of the island ===
==== Kandholhudhoo predicament ====
Even before the tsunami destroyed Kandholhudhoo, living conditions in the island were deteriorating due to extreme congestion and matters grew worse due to an explosive rise in population. The largest population of Raa Atoll was cramped in the smallest inhabited island of the atoll.

To address the issues the government decided to start a land reclamation project of Kandholhudhoo lagoon. The lagoon was so small in size; the whole project was doomed from the start as it was impossible to provide any remedy for lack of land. This was a political move to appease a large population center rather than a coherent step to address the real issues. The reclamation of the lagoon destroyed the house reef which protected the island. The houses of the island were less than 20 feet away from the open sea. Thus, the island became a basin in the middle of the ocean and water poured from all directions as there was no reef to protect the island from waves and tidal rise.

Overcrowded island of Kandholhudhoo before the 2004 tsunami struck.

There were muted and unsubstantial discussions among a handful of Kandholhudhoo natives for a move to a larger island. Though land was scarce and living conditions were difficult in Kandholhudhoo, the residents of the island enjoyed a good economic subsistence, due to a generous supply of fish and close proximity to fishing areas.

==== Selection of Dhuvaafaru ====
In early 2005 a meeting was held at Ungoofaaru where the majority of Kandholhudhoo people were residing. A delegation from the government and tsunami victims from Kandholhudhoo participated in this meeting. The residents were asked to submit the names of the islands which they were considering for migration. The names of Dhuvaafaru and Ifuru were discussed and majority voted for Dhuvaafaru as their choice.

==== Redevelopment ====
In an agreement made by the International Federation of Red Cross and Red Crescent Societies with the government of Maldives in May 2005, they pledged to fund the construction of 562 houses and other necessary buildings and facilities for a community to flourish. All together 600 houses were constructed in Dhuvaafaru; 38 of which were funded by the government. International Federation of Red Cross and Red Crescent Societies committed to fund over 30 million US Dollars for Dhuvaafaru project.

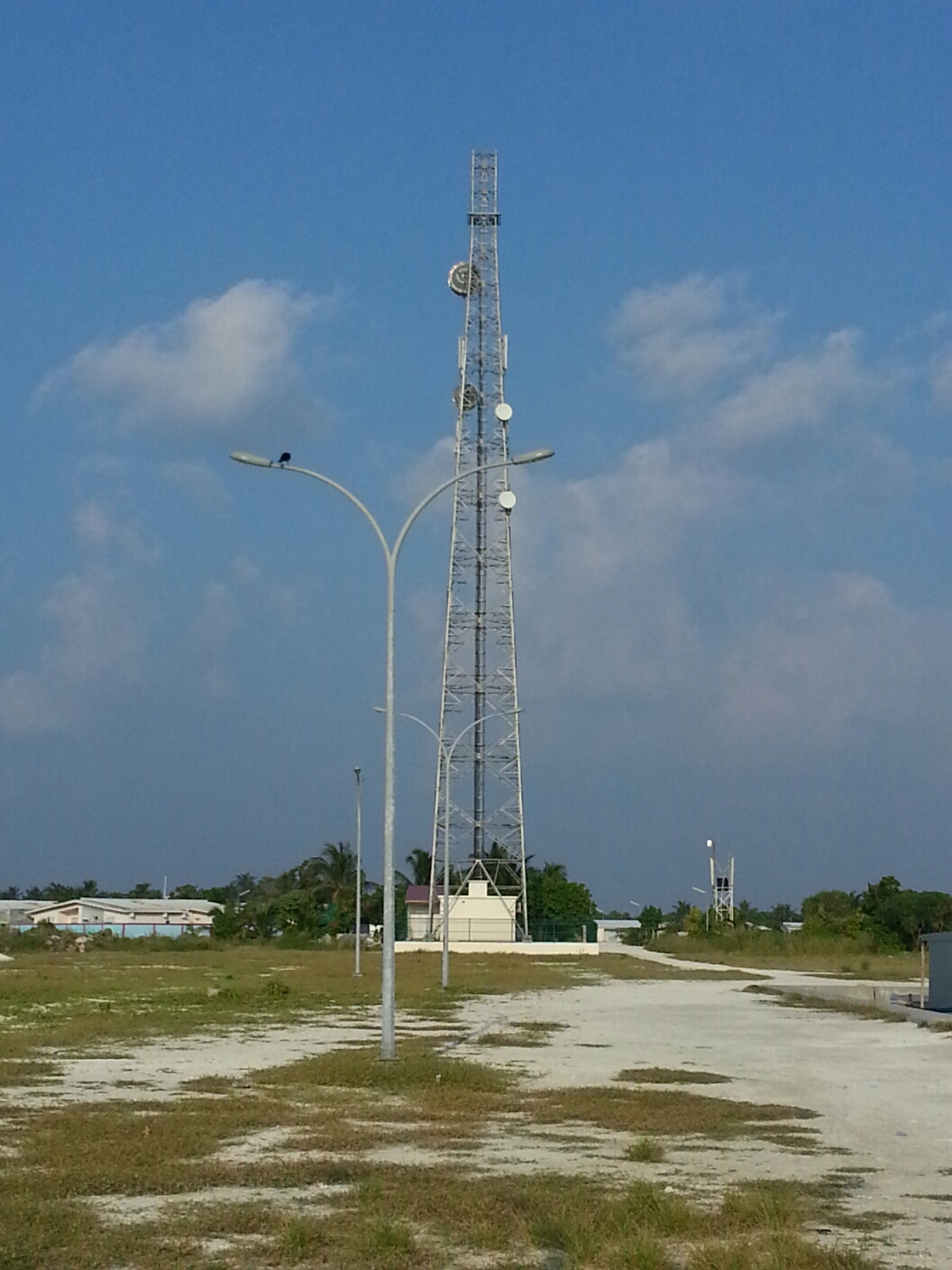
Telecommunications tower in Dhuvaafaru.

An agreement was signed between Maldivian government and the joint venture companies of Amin Construction of Maldives and Singapore's Liang Beng to develop Dhuvaafaru on 13 February 2006. The bidding process was marred by allegation of corruption and it took over a year to finalise the contractors. Corruption allegations were brought against Amin Constructions by another local company called Moreway Constructions with regard to the bidding process. On 17 November 2005, the government revoked the contract of US$17.4 million awarded to the joint venture companies Arun Excello of India and Apollo Holdings of Maldives saying that the bidding documents were incomplete but the government failed to provide an explanation as to why the bid was accepted in the first place.

Construction work in Dhuvaafaru started in April 2006 and the building of a new community was completed in over 2 years. While the construction was ongoing The IFRC provided Kandholhudhoo residents the opportunity of visiting Dhuvaafaru once a month and inspect the progress. The IFRC representatives continued consultation with the displaced people in various islands of Raa Atoll with regard to Dhuvaafaru project. On 31 August 2008 The IFRC handed over the pre-school, primary school, secondary school, auditorium and community administrative building to the government after work was completed.

==== Resettlement ====
Dhuvaafaru was officially inaugurated as an inhabited island by former President Mohamed Nasheed on 2 March 2009. Representatives of the American, Australian, British, Canadian, French, Japanese and New Zealand Red Cross societies and those of The IFRC and the Maldivian government participated in the inaugural function.

The allocation of houses was overseen by the Kandholhudhoo Island Office under the supervision of now defunct Atolls Ministry. Preference was given to provide shelter for people who lived at Kandholhudhoo. Hence some people belonging to Kandholhudhoo who had houses in the island were not awarded houses in Dhuvaafaru, because they were living elsewhere. There were complaints and disagreements as to the way the houses were distributed. The IFRC held a lottery where the head of each household participated and picked the house that they will be residing in Dhuvaafaru. People started migrating to the island on 14 December 2008 and it took two weeks for the whole process to be completed. MNDF and Maldives Police Service assisted the evacuation efforts.

== Geography ==
Dhuvaafaru is situated in Raa Atoll which is officially known as North Maalhosmadulu Atoll. The island is located between the atoll capital of Ungoofaaru and Maakurathu. The island is 168.83 km (105 mi; 91 nmi) north of the country's capital, Malé. From Dhuvaafaru in a normal boat it takes about 20 minutes to reach atoll capital Ungoofaaru and over 8 hours to reach capital city Malé.

Dhuvaafaru is the second largest island in Raa Atoll with 44 ha (110 acres) of land, having a lagoon almost twice the size of the landmass. The island which is less than a meter above sea level was entirely covered with trees until they were cut down for redevelopment. A house reef protects the island which has white sandy beaches around it. Towards the west and south side of the island soil erosion has caused loss of land and plants. Houses and the power plant situated in this area are at risk due to soil erosion and storm surges. The islanders with the help of Maldives National Defence Force have constructed to some extent, concrete barriers around the shore to prevent further erosion.

To the north of Dhuvaafaru, within the same lagoon there is a small Huraagandu called Dhuvaafaruhuraa. In Dhivehi, the word Huraagandu is used to refer to small islets made up of mostly stones and corals. This small island of less than 300 feet is a landmass consisting of coral and stone and there is a wild growth of a tree called Kuredhi (ironwood).

== Demography ==
Historical population
Year	Pop.	±%
2014	2,924	—
2022	3,321	+13.6%
2014-2022: Census populations Source:

== Governance ==
The newly elected government of President Mohamed Nasheed decided to make a committee known as the Dhuvaafaru Development Committee and appoint Dr. Ahmed Raazee; a medical doctor by profession as his envoy to the committee.

The Maldivian Democratic Party led government which came to power on 11 November 2008 embarked on a mission to introduce gradual changes in the way the government was run, with the view of consolidating their power. One step taken in this regard was appointment of island and atoll Councillors who were granted powers over the existing atoll and island chiefs. This appointment was not done under a law as the Decentralization Act was not in place then. Unlike in other islands, in Dhuvaafaru a Councillor was not appointed by the president but rather an election was held to elect one. In an election held on early 2009 which was contested by three candidates, Mr. Ismail Ahmed emerged as the winner, becoming the first ever elected Councillor in the history of Maldives. He remained as the island Councillor until new Councillors were elected.

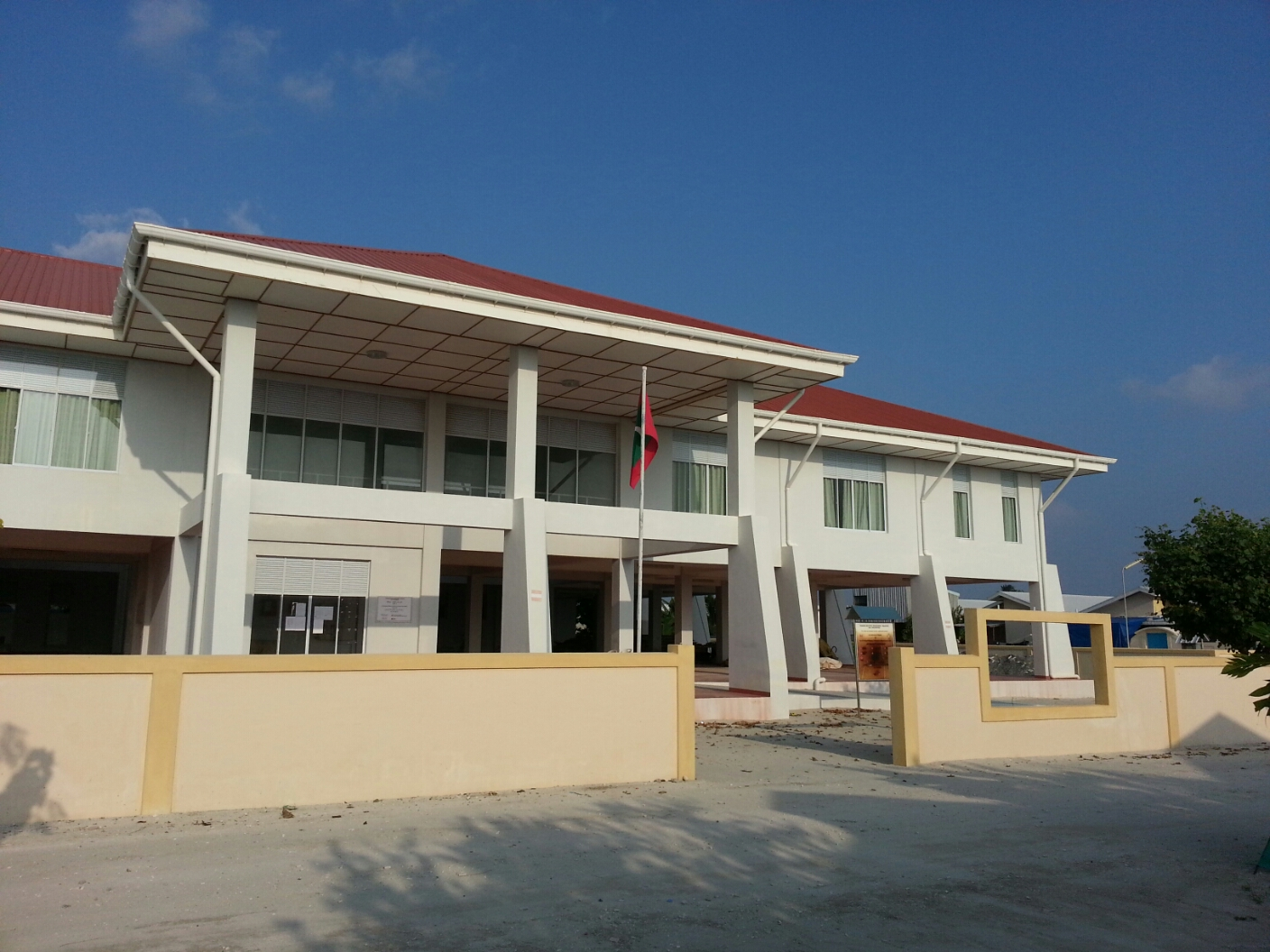
Dhuvaafaru Council Office.

Under the newly ratified Decentralization Act, local council elections were held across Maldives on 5 February 2011. In Dhuvaafaru numerous candidates contested as party representatives or as independents. From the seven seats available in Dhuvaafaru council four seats went to Dhivehi Rayyithunge Party, two seats to independent candidates and one seat to Maldivian Democratic Party. An independent candidate, Mr. Ibrahim Shukry was elected by the Councillors as the council president. The council is assisted by civil servants in the administration of Dhuvaafaru.

Dhuvaafaru is a constituency in the Parliament of the Maldives having a member who represents the island. Mohamed Zubair who ran as an independent candidate in 2009 parliamentary elections, was the first elected member of parliament from the Dhuvaafaru Constituency. In 2014 Mohamed Ali was elected as the new Member of Parliament for Dhuvaafaru on a Progressive Party of Maldives ticket.

== Economy ==
=== Infrastructure ===
The Dhuvaafaru project by The IFRC was "the biggest single construction project in the organization’s history." 600 houses were built for the 4000 strong population of Kandholhudhoo by August 2008 under the project. Each house had three rooms, two bathrooms, one kitchen and it was equipped with a 2500-liter tank to store rain water. Recently the government has committed to construct another 76 houses for residents who were not awarded houses in the first phase.

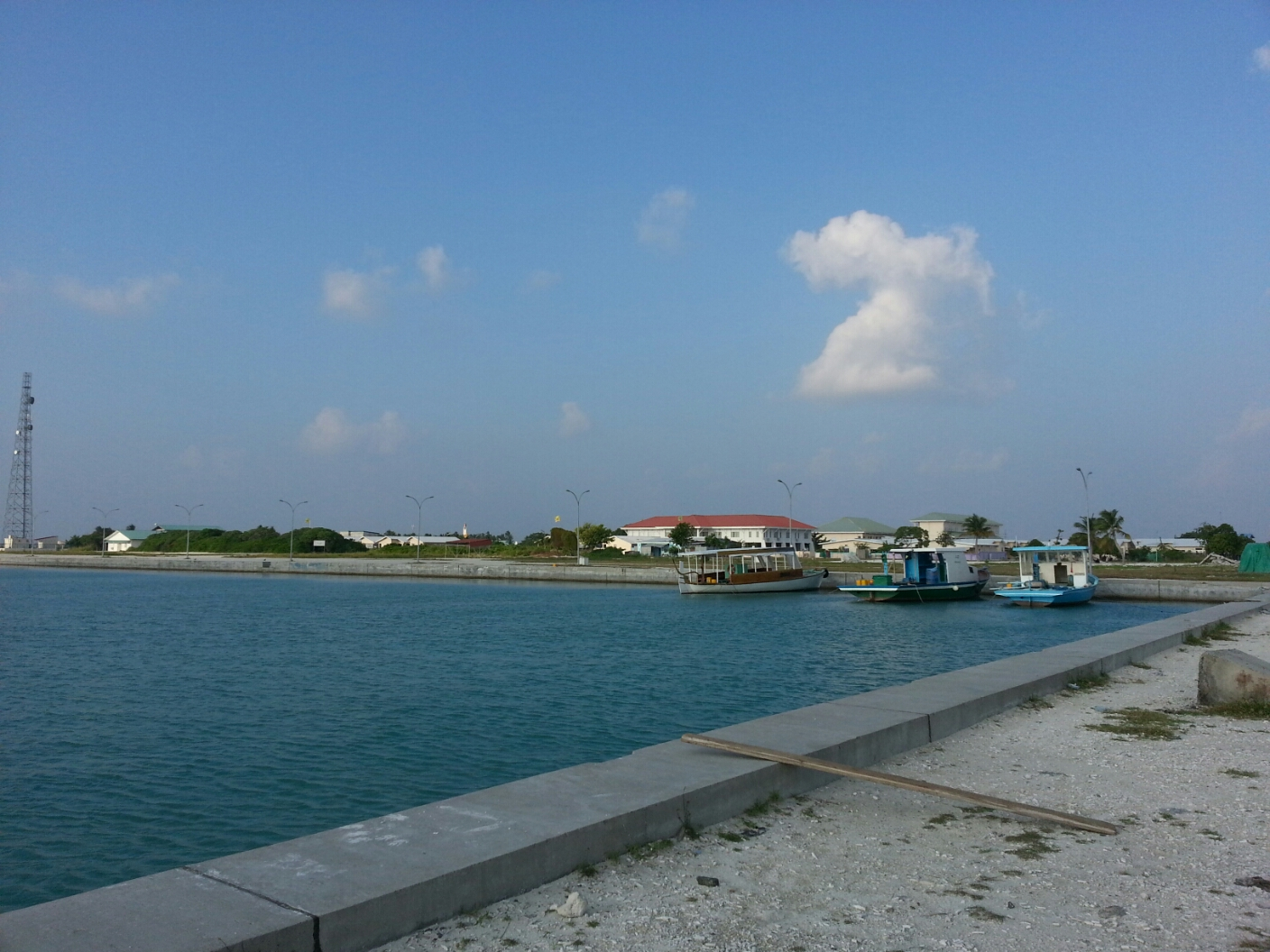
Dhuvaafaru Harbour, funded by US and Maldives government jointly.

In addition to the houses IFRC funded the construction of community infrastructure such as an administrative building, a pre-school, primary school and secondary school, an auditorium, water supply and sewage systems, a sports complex, roads, mosque, and a power supply system. Currently, there are two mosques in the island, one funded by the government.

On 9 May 2010 MNDF completed the renovation of the roads in Dhuvaafaru. This project was carried out to upgrade the road condition and over 11 km (6.8 mi) of road was improved. A modern harbour costing over US Dollar 5.2 million was also constructed in the island. This project was funded jointly by the governments of United States and Maldives.

Some houses in Dhuvaafaru cannot obtain clean water from the ground as the area is a marshland and there were protests in 2011 about this issue. On 18 March 2012 a project worth 13 Million Maldivian Ruffiya was awarded to Male' Water and Sewerage Company by the government to construct a water plant to produce clean mineral water for the populace. This project is conducted with the view of providing clean water to nearby islands and atolls.

In the land use plan of Dhuvaafaru, land was identified for specific purposes; being one of the best planned island in the Maldives. Green zones were identified, where trees had to be planted and cutting them were prohibited. Specific areas were identified for shops and a separate industrial area was identified for works related to fisheries and agriculture.

=== Employment ===
Kandholhudhoo residents were mainly fishermen, and this continued and majority of the workforce in Dhuvaafaru work in the fisheries industry. Kandholhudhoo is still used by Dhuvaafaru fisherman as a hub where they conduct fishing operations. Dry fish and salted fish are harvested in Kandholhudhoo.

The second most popular choice of employment among the people is in tourism.

== Education ==
There are two government schools in Dhuvaafaru built by IFRC. Raa Atoll School provides secondary education to grades between 7 and 10. This school is targeted for IGCSE Ordinary Level students. Recently A-level also has been introduced.

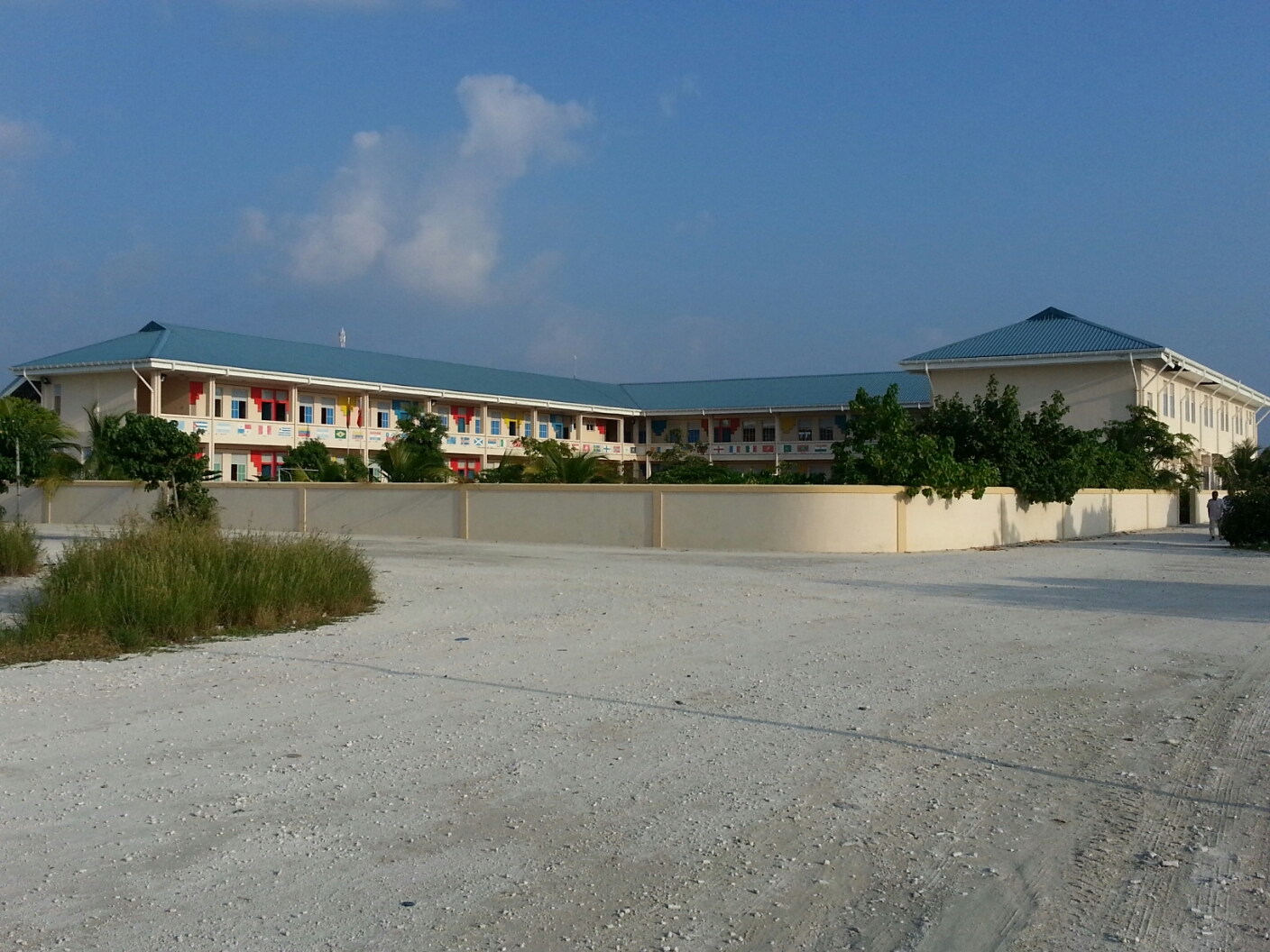
Dhuvaafaru Primary School (DPS)

Dhuvaafaru Primary School teaches students from the grades of 1 to 6.

A pre-school which is run privately with the assistance of government provides kindergarten education.

== See also ==
Kandholhudhoo (Raa Atoll)
