= Rasgetheemu =

Rasgetheemu ރަސްގެތީމު
- Inhabited island
- Location in Maldives
- Coordinates: 5°48′29″N 73°0′12″E
- Country: Maldives
- Administrative atoll: Raa Atoll
- Distance to Malé: 189.06 km (117.48 mi)

Government
  - Council: Rasgetheemu Council

Dimensions
  - Length: 0.875 km (0.544 mi)
  - Width: 0.425 km (0.264 mi)

Population (2022)
  - Total: 537
- Time zone: UTC+05:00 (MST)

Rasgetheemu (Dhivehi: ރަސްގެތީމު) is an inhabited island located in Maalhosmadhulu Uthuruburi, known administratively as Raa Atoll.

== History ==
Maldivian legend says that a Sinhalese prince got stranded with his bride - the daughter of the Sri Lankan King in Rasgetheemu, the original 'King's Island'.

=== Etymology ===
The name comes from Ras + ge + theemu. The word Ras means rule or monarchy, ge literally means house, and theemu meaning island. The word Theemu came from Tamil word Theevu also meaning island. It probably came from the Tamil speakers of chola empire which used to rule northern atolls of Maldives. Theemu appears in the names of other islands, including Agolhitheemu, Utheemu.) Historians believe that Rasgetheem means "the King’s Town" or "King’s Island".

== Geography ==
The island lies of the eastern fringe of Raa Atoll, and the island is 189.06 km (117 mi; 102 nmi) north of the country's capital, Malé.

== Demography ==
Historical population
Year	Pop.	±%
2006	504	—
2014	487	−3.4%
2022	537	+10.3%
2006-2014-2022: Census populations Source:
