= HCS Palinurus (1823) =

Naval ship of the British East India Company

History

East India Company
- Operator: Bombay Marine
- Builder: Bombay Dockyard
- Launched: 27 February 1823 (Note: Two sources give a launch year of 1822. However, Hackman gives more a more precise launch date and burthen.)
- Fate: Still listed in 1862

General characteristics
- Tons burthen: 192, or 19225/9 (bm)
- Sail plan: Sloop, or brig
- Armament: 8 guns

HCS Palinurus (or Palinurius) was a sloop or brig that the Bombay Dockyard launched in 1823 for the Bombay Marine, the naval arm of the British East India Company. She served as a pilot ship, survey vessel mapping the Red Sea and the coast of Yemen and Oman, and generally as a naval ship. She was still listed in 1862.

== Career ==
The Bombay Marine used Palinurus as a survey vessel. Between 1829 and 1833 Robert Moresby captained Palinarus. Together with Thomas Elwon, in HCS Benares, he mapped the Red Sea. In 1830 Palinarus underwent refitting in Bombay after she had mapped the Gulf of Suez. After Moresby left Palinarus in 1833, she continued her surveying under the command of Captain Stafford B. Haines, who would later become the first British official in charge of the Protectorate of Aden. He surveyed the southern coast of Arabia.

On 18 December 1836 the whaler Reliance was wrecked on or foundered near Al Sawda (Soda) Island in the Curia Maria Islands, off the coast of Oman. Palinurus rescued the crew.

In 1838 Palinarius appeared on a list of vessels of the Indian Navy, which rated her as a brig of the 4th Class.

On 4 August 1843 the paddle steam-frigate INS Memnon (1841) wrecked on Cape Guardafui. When Captain Sir Robert Oliver, Superintendent of the Indian Navy, heard of the loss, he recalled to Bombay Palinurus from Kurrachee where she was serving as a guardship. He then directed Lieutenant C.D.Campbell, her commander to sail to the wreck site to conduct salvage operations. Palinurus arrived at Bombay on 7 October, sailed on 17 October after having taken on the necessary diving equipment, and arrived at the wreck site on 31 October. She returned to Bombay on 2 June, having twice visited Aden to deliver the salvaged stores and her two 68-pounder guns.

== Fate ==
Palinurus was listed in 1862.
