= Rasmaadhoo =

Rasmaadhoo ރަސްމާދޫ
- Inhabited island
- Location in Maldives
- Coordinates: 05°33′48″N 73°02′37″E
- Country: Maldives
- Administrative atoll: Northern Maalhosmadulu Atoll
- Distance to Malé: 161.94 km (100.62 mi)

Government
  - Island Chief: Ahmed Maahir

Dimensions
  - Length: 0.775 km (0.482 mi)
  - Width: 0.400 km (0.249 mi)

Population (2022)
  - Total: 554
- Time zone: UTC+05:00 (MST)

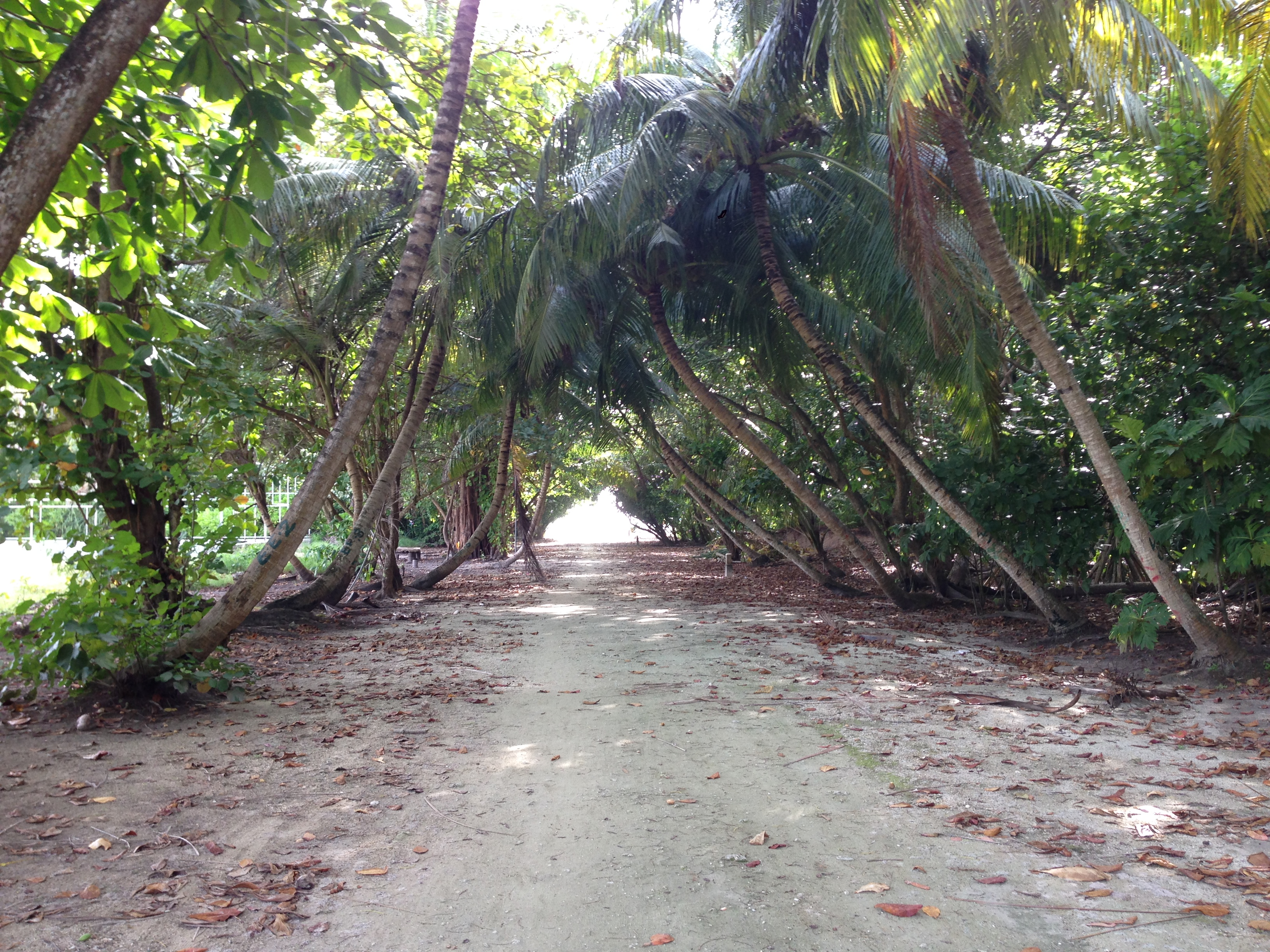

Rasmaadhoo (Dhivehi: ރަސްމާދޫ) is one of the inhabited islands in Raa Atoll, Maldives.

== Geography ==
The island is 161.94 km (101 mi; 87 nmi) north of the country's capital, Malé. The island is 775 m (848 yd) in length and 400 m (440 yd) in width, with an area of 22.7 ha (56 acres).

== Demography ==
It has a population of 825. Most of the islanders have migrated to the Capital City Male.

Historical population
Year	Pop.	±%
2006	487	—
2014	496	+1.8%
2022	554	+11.7%
2006-2014-2022: Census populations Source:

== Governance ==
The president of the council is Mohamed Asif, who is elected as an Independent member. Other members of the island council include Muruthalo Rasheed (PPM) Abdhul Hameed Hassan (PPM) Aminath Firasha (MDP).

== Economy ==
Most men of Rasmaadhoo are fishermen.

== Culture and sport ==
Rasmaadhoo is famous for Boduberu and surfing.
