= Ungoofaaru =

Ungoofaaru އުނގޫފާރު
- Inhabited island
- Location in Maldives
- Coordinates: 05°40′05″N 73°01′50″E
- Country: Maldives
- Administrative atoll: Northern Maalhosmadulhu Atoll
- Distance to Malé: 173.39 km (107.74 mi)

Government
  - Island Chief: Ab.

Dimensions
  - Length: 0.775 km (0.482 mi)
  - Width: 0.450 km (0.280 mi)

Population (2022)
  - Total: 1,754
- Time zone: UTC+05:00 (MST)

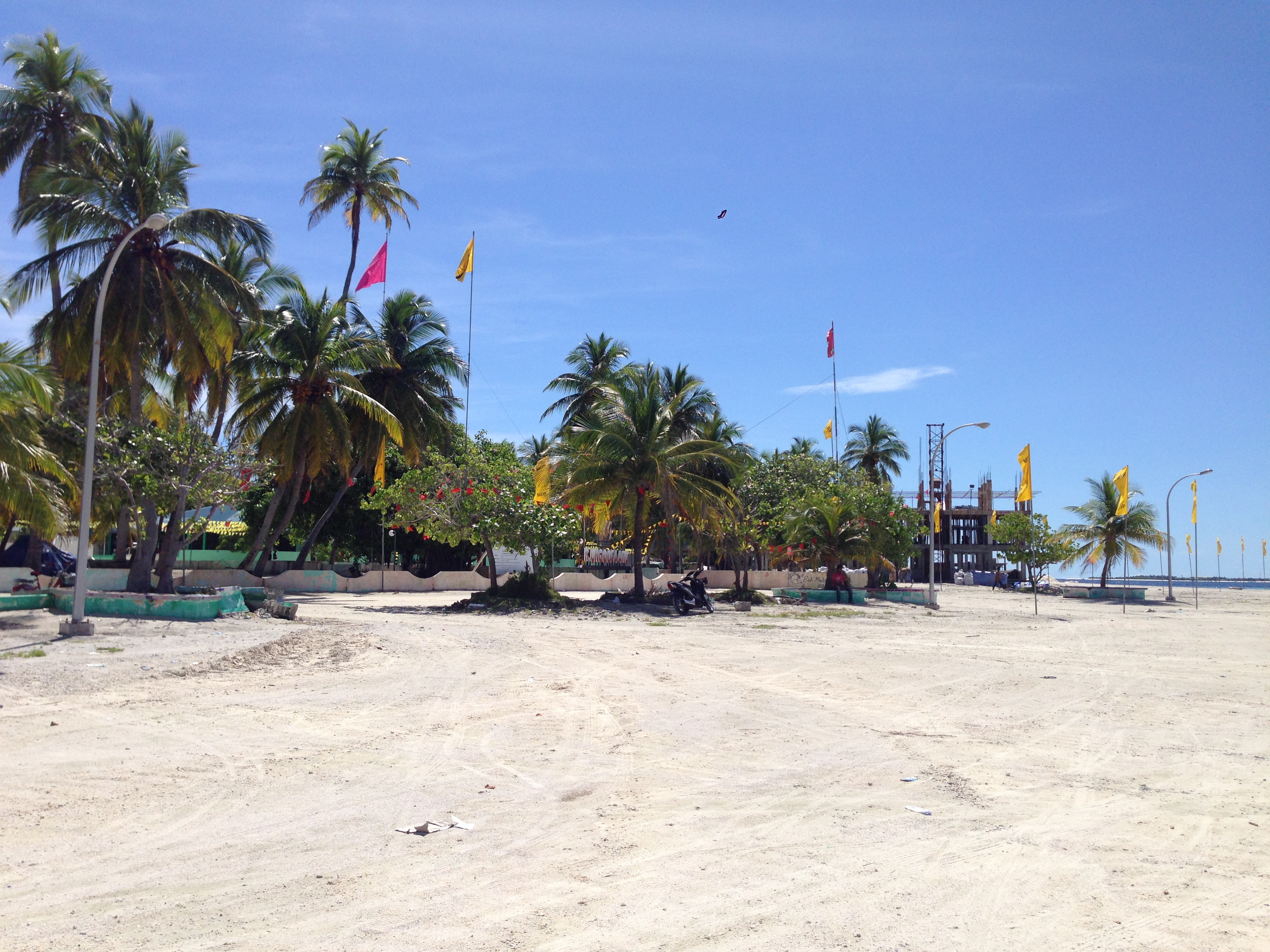

Ungoofaaru (Dhivehi: އުނގޫފާރު) is an inhabited island located in Northern Maalhosmadulhu Atoll, which is an administrative division of the Maldives. It is also the capital of Northern Maalhosmadulhu Atoll.

== Geography ==
The island is 173.39 km (108 mi; 94 nmi) north of the country's capital, Malé. The island is quite small, being about 0.775 km (0.482 mi) long and 0.450 km (0.280 mi), It is located on the Eastern rim of the atoll, along with many other inhabited islands of the same Atoll.

== Demography ==
Following the 2004 tsunami, the residents of the devastated Kandholhudhoo island were moved into temporary accommodation on Ungoofaaru, before being rehoused on nearby Dhuvaafaru in 2008.

Historical population
Year	Pop.	±%
2006	2,988	—
2014	1,388	−53.5%
2022	1,754	+26.4%
2006-2022: Census populations Source:

== Infrastructure ==
Ungoofaaru school is located in the center of the island. The island has 3 mosques, Ungoofaaru Islamic Centre, Ungoofaaru Anhenunge Miskiyy (Ungoofaaru Women's Mosque) and Masjid Al-Thaquvaa. The island is the location for Ungoofaaru Regional Hospital, the largest hospital in the Northern Province.
