= Kandholhudhoo (Raa Atoll) =

- Uninhabited island
- The island of Kandholhudhoo (foreground) that was completely destroyed by the tsunami of 2004. Residents took temporary residence in other nearby islands including Bandaveri island (background)

- Location in Maldives
- Coordinates: 05°37′06″N 72°51′20″E
- Country: Maldives
- Administrative atoll: Raa Atoll
- Distance to Malé: 175 km (109 mi)

Area
  - Total: 0.12 km^{2} (0.046 sq mi)

Dimensions
  - Length: 0.475 km (0.295 mi)
  - Width: 0.150 km (0.093 mi)
- Time zone: UTC+05:00 (MST)

Kandholhudhoo (Dhivehi: ކަނދޮޅުދޫ) is one of the formerly inhabited islands of Raa Atoll in the Maldives. It is 175 Kilometers away from the capital of the country, Malé.

== Tsunami ==
Kandholhudhoo was one of the few Islands that were Completely Destroyed by the 2004 Indian Ocean Tsunami.

=== Before Tsunami ===
Before the Tsunami, Kandholhudhoo was the most populated island of Raa Atoll, Even more populated than the capital of the Atoll Un'goofaaru, or the vice capital, Meedhoo. The Population of the Island was roughly 3,700 People, Although even before the tsunami, living conditions on the island were not prefereable. The island was the smallest inhabited island in Raa atoll, measuring only 0.12 km2. 3,700 People were cramped together in the tiny Island, which caused the island to be overpopulated.

=== After Tsunami ===
The Tsunami completely destroyed the island, which forced the residents to take temporary residence in other nearby islands including Bandaveri island. After the tsunami, the 3,700-strong population of Kandholhudhoo was scattered over five different islands in the Raa Atoll. In 2008, the people of Kandholhudhoo came together once again to repopulate the then uninhabited island of Dhuvaafaru. They were given free homes to live in by the Government of Maldives.
