= Raa Atoll =

Coordinates: 5°38′N 72°55′E

- atoll of the Maldives
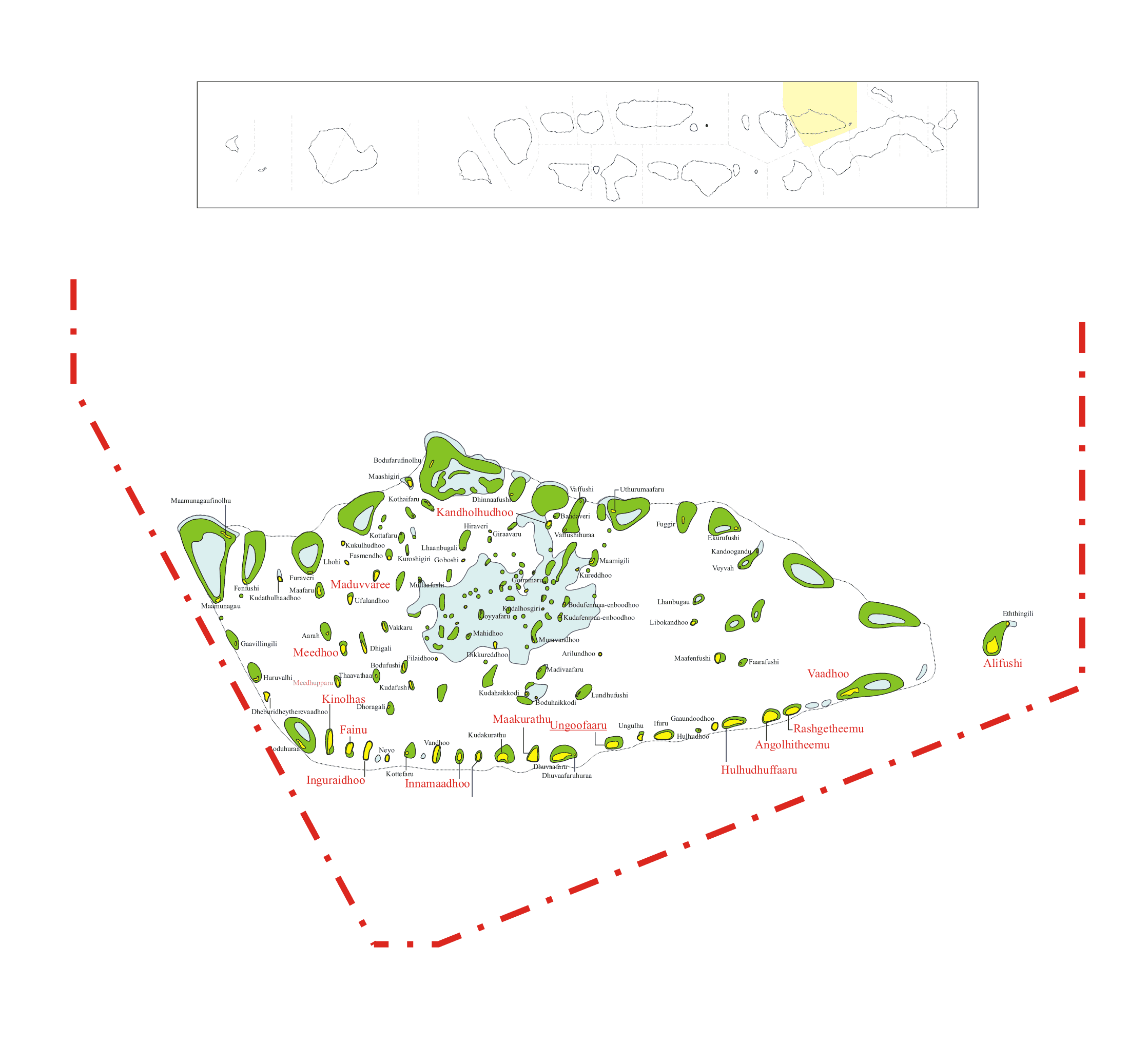
- Northern Maalhosmadulu Atoll and Alifushi Island (north is to the right)

- Location of Raa in Maldives
- Country: Maldives
- Corresponding geographic atoll(s): Maalhosmadulu Uthuruburi
- Location: 5° 58' N and 5° 20' N
- Capital: Ungoofaaru

Government
  - Atoll Chief: Hussain Nasif

Population
  - Total: 24,862
- Letter code: E
- Dhivehi letter code: R (ރ)
  - Number of islands: 88
  - Inhabited islands: Alifushi * Angolhitheemu * Dhuvaafaru * Fainu * Hulhudhuffaaru * Inguraidhoo * Innamaadhoo * Kinolhas * Maakurathu * Maduvvaree * Maamigili * Meedhoo * Rasgetheemu * Rasmaadhoo * Ungoofaaru * Vaadhoo
  - Uninhabited islands: Aarah, Arilundhoo, Badaveri, Bodufarufinolhu, Bodufenmaaenboodhoo, Bodufushi, Boduhaiykodi, Boduhuraa, Ekurufushi, Etthingili, Dhigali, Dhoragali, Dheburidheythereyvaadhoo, Dhikkurendhdhoo, Dhinnaafushi, Dhuvaafaruhuraa, Faarafushi, Fasmendhoo, Fenfushi, Fuggiri, Furaveri, Gaaudoodhoo, Giraavaru, Goyyafaru, Guboshi, Hiraveri, Hulhudhoo, Huruvalhi, Ifuru, Kaddogadu, Kandholhudhoo, Kothaifaru, Kottafaru, Kottefaru, Kudafushi, Kudahaiykodi, Kudakurathu, Kudalhosgiri, Kudathulhaadhoo, Kukulhudhoo, Kuroshigiri, Lhaanbugali, Lhaanbugau, Lhohi, Liboakandhoo, Lundhufushi, Maafaru, Maamunagaufinolhu, Maanenfushi, Maashigiri, Madivaafaru, Mahidhoo, Meedhupparu, Muravandhoo, Mullaafushi, Neyo, Thaavathaa, Ufulandhoo, Ungulu, Uthurumaafaru, Vaffushihuraa, Vandhoo, Veyvah, Viligili, Wakkaru
- Resort islands(*), airports(¤) and industrial islands are also considered uninhabited.

Raa Atoll (also known as Northern Maalhosmadulu Atoll or Maalhosmadulu Uthuruburi) is an administrative division of the Maldives. The capital is Ungoofaaru. It includes Northern Maalhosmadulu Atoll proper and the island of Dhuvaafaru. Raa Atoll has the highest number of populated islands in the Maldives.

The Northern Maalhosmadulu Atoll and the islands of Alifushi and Etthingili (not in the picture) make up Raa Atoll

1. Alifushi and Etthingili (Powell Islands in the Admiralty Chart) stand on a detached reef of their own with very deep waters (no sounding) between this faru and the northern end of the main atoll.

2. Northern Maalhosmadulu Atoll is 35 miles (56 km) in length from N to S, and 15 miles (24 km) across at its broadest part. Its western fringe is composed of a series of round or oval reefs (farus) irregularly placed (a feature peculiar to all the larger Northern Atolls). The centre is heavily dotted with coral patches (giri), some submerged and some awash. The concentration of giri is especially dense towards its SW quarter, close to Kandholhudhu Island (where there is the place most crowded with small reefs and shoals in the whole Maldives), but its narrower northern end is quite clear of reefs. The general depths of the lagoon are from 23 to 27 fathoms (138 to 162 ft; 42 to 49 m).

This Atoll marks the start of the east–west divide of the Maldivian Atolls between Kaashidhoo Kandu and Kudahuvadhoo Kandu.

The capital of Northern Maalhosmadulu Atoll is Ungoofaaru. Recently, the island has been reclaimed up to the edge of the reef in order to provide land for social and economic activities for the growing population.

By 1942, there were 18 inhabited islands in the atoll. However, the residents of these 18 islands were relocated to nearby islands. By 17 October 1968, there were 17 inhabited islands in the atoll. In 1968 and 1967, the people of Ufulandhoo were relocated to Alifushi in the atoll under a government project. The project was to relocate people from islands who were under 50 years of age of mandatory prayer to other islands. People were relocated from Kudafushi as because of the Second World War people were dying due to food shortages and hunger. The atoll chief governor feared that if people were not relocated to other islands they could no longer get help and with people dying the village would become empty. The people of Kudafushi were relocated to their relatives' islands upon their request. The islands that they were relocated are Meedhoo, Ufulandhoo and Maduvvari. On 17 October 1968 after people of Ufulandhoo transferred to Alifushi, they asked the government for permission to be relocated to Maduvvari. The government agreed and they moved to Maduvvari with their families. After the island of Ufulandhoo became uninhabited island, one of the 16 inhabited islands such as Ugulu and Gaaudoodhoo having difficulty of the lagoon for departure and because of the damages happening to the sea vessels and there is no space for housing as the islands become overpopulated, because of these reasons the people of Ungulu and Gaaudoodhoo wanted move to the island of Hulhudhuffaaru with compensation of having their personal belongings move to the island. The project of relocating the two island people to Hulhudhuffaaru started in 1992 and completed on 13 March 1993.

Following 2004 boxing tsunami, the living condition of Kandholhudhoo became too deplorable, and the ruins were beyond repair, The government let them choose a new home, Either Ifuru or Dhuvaafaru, the majority of them chose Dhuvaafaru, and while Dhuvaafaru was under construction, the people of Kandholhudhoo were distributed among other inhabited islands in Raa Atoll, Mostly to Ungoofaaru.

NOTE: Haa Alifu, Haa Dhaalu, Shaviyani, Noonu, Raa, Baa, Kaafu, etc. are code letters assigned to the present administrative divisions of the Maldives. They are not the proper names of the natural atolls that make up these divisions. Some atolls are divided into two administrative divisions while other divisions are made up of two or more natural atolls. The order followed by the code letters is from North to South, beginning with the first letters of the Thaana alphabet used in Dhivehi. These code letters are not accurate from the geographical and cultural point of view. However, they have become popular among tourists and foreigners in the Maldives who find them easier to pronounce than the true atoll names in Dhivehi, (save a few exceptions, like Ari Atoll).

Alifushi, located at the northern end of the atoll, is an island which has been traditionally famous for its skilled boatbuilding carpenters. It now houses shipyards.

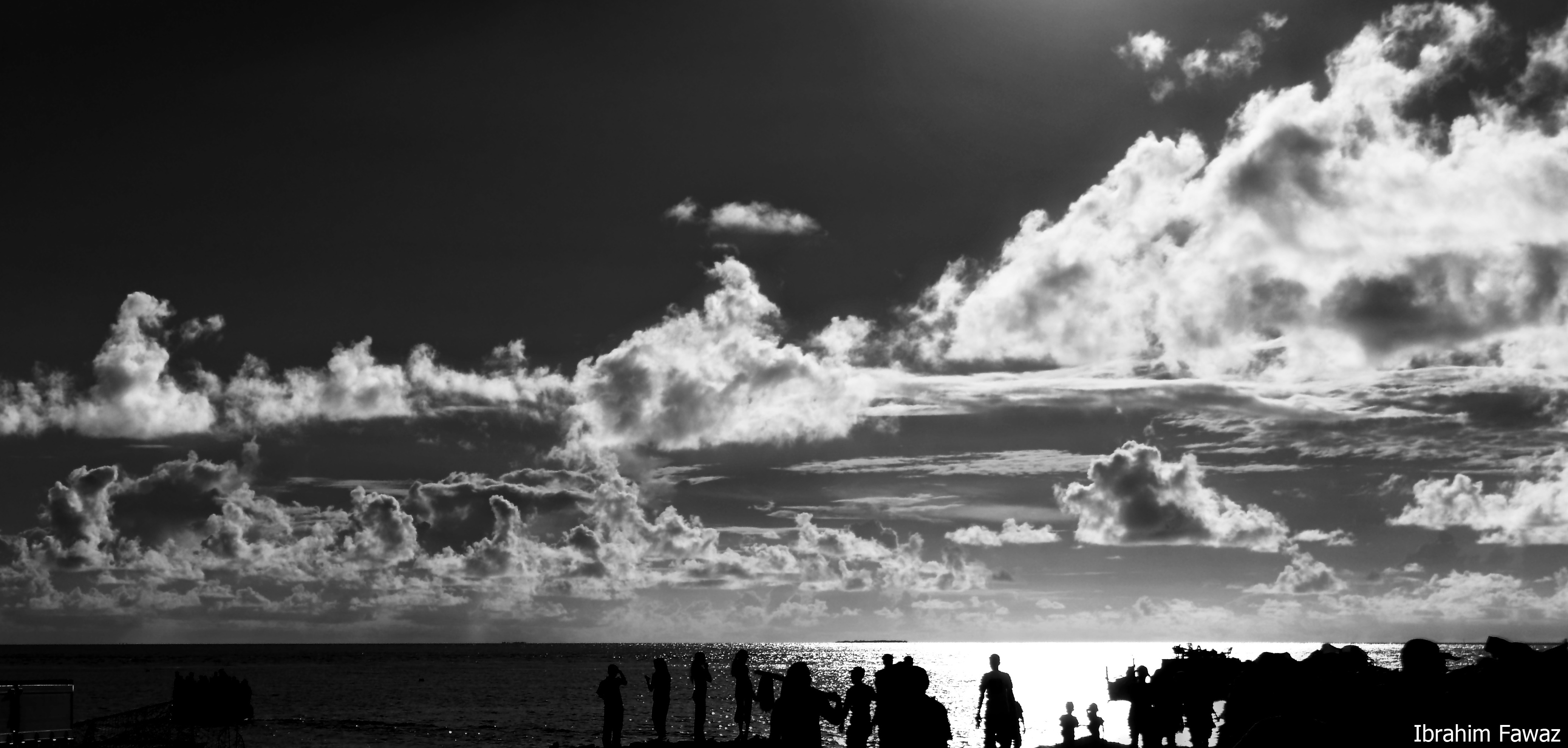
Relocation of Kandholhudhoo displaced people to Raa Dhuvaafaru, after the 2004 Dec Tsunami

== Moresby Channel (Hanikandu) ==
Hanikandu is the channel between Northern Maalhosmadulu Atoll and "Fasdhūtere" Atoll, beyond its southern border. This channel is also known as Moresby Channel in the honor of Robert Moresby, an almost forgotten captain and draughtsman, who with much patience and hard work charted all the Atolls of the Maldives.

== Tourism ==
Formerly this atoll was off-limits for tourists; since the late 1990s there was a change in government policy. The main tourist resort islands are Loama Maamigili and Meedhupparu.
