= Robert Moresby =

British naval officer (1794–1854)

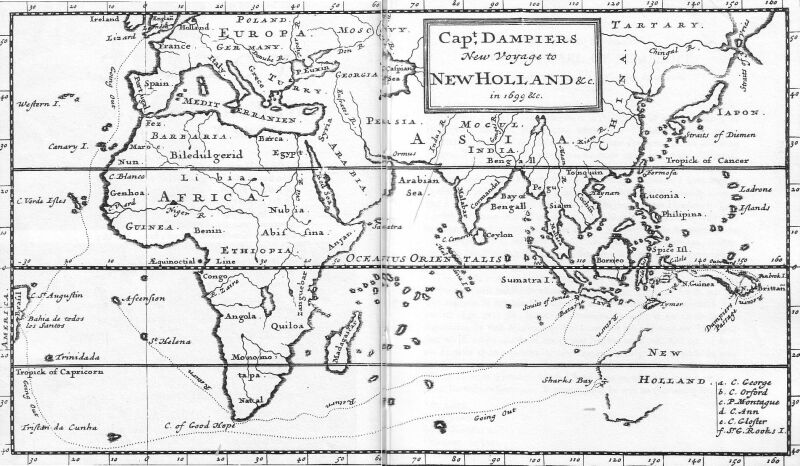
1699 map of the Red Sea and the Indian Ocean. Before Robert Moresby's laborious work, maps of these areas were very inaccurate.

Captain Robert Moresby (15 June 1794 – 15 June 1854 (Note: Some sources mention that he is thought to have died in 1863.)) was a British naval officer, hydrographer and surveyor who served in the Bombay Marine and Indian Navy.

As a Lieutenant under Commander Thomas Elwon, Moresby was part of a two-ship exercise engaged (from 1829 to 1832) in charting the dangerous waters of the Red Sea. Later, he also charted some coralline archipelagoes of the Indian Ocean, such as the Maldives, Laccadives and Chagos in the 1820s and '30s. This work ensured that the route from Europe to the East Indies became viable for the new steam vessels.

Robert Moresby was a son of Mr Fairfax Moresby of Lichfield, Staffs, late of India, where Fairfax Moresby had practised as a lawyer. Fairfax Moresby and his wife Mary Rotton had 6 boys and 3 girls, the eldest of whom was Sir Fairfax Moresby, Admiral of the British Fleet, and Commander in Chief, Channel Squadron and Pacific Station. Robert Moresby's relation to the family is uncertain and it is possible he was the son of another liaison of his father, which might explain his employment in the Bombay Marine, which suffered greatly from being at the bottom of the East India Company's pecking order.

== The East India route and the new era of trade and communication ==
In the nineteenth century, the sea route between the Mediterranean Sea and India would come to play a key role in a new era of communication. Already before the opening of the Suez Canal, industrial Britain had a rapidly expanding economy and needed improved communication with British India, with its raw materials and imperial requirements. Crucial in the development of the Red Sea route between the two countries was the harnessing of steam power, most notably in the form of the marine steam engine. A further vital factor in this revolution in trade and transport was the charting of the hazardous waterway commissioned by the British East India Company and carried out by Commander Thomas Elwon of the Bombay Marine in the ship Benares, supported by his second-in-command, Lt Robert Moresby in the Bombay Marine's brig Palinurus. This was the culmination of a series of efforts to get such a survey under way that the Marine had begun with the work of Lieutenant White of the Marine in the HEICS Panther in 1795.

== Lack of accurate maps ==
The Red Sea is full of navigational hazards, but at that time, reliable charts were not available. Surveys of the Red Sea, other than the intimate knowledge of the waters had by Arab pilots, had begun with the Portuguese João de Castro in 1540, with his Roteiro da Mar Roxa. Knowledge had accumulated in the years since, much of it being cross-correlated by the East India Company's first hydrographer, Alexander Dalrymple, and subsequently by his successor, James Horsburgh. By the time of the Elwon/Moresby survey, the marine steam engine appeared to be racing to the rescue of British communications with India; the engine, first tested on Scottish lochs and American rivers, was by 1826 attempting the Cape route to India.

In that year a 479-ton wooden paddle steamer, HEICS Enterprise, steamed (mostly sailed in fact) from London to Calcutta. Its progress was particularly noted by two individuals: a river pilot named Thomas Waghorn who was impressed by the steamer's steady progress against the wind up the Hooghly river to Calcutta, and indirectly by the Governor of Bombay, Mountstuart Elphinstone. A year later Elphinstone, together with the secretary of the Calcutta government and his wife, Mr and Mrs Lushington, chose to return to England via the Red Sea, sailing on a cramped little brig, Palinurus. This involved disembarking at Qusayr and crossing the desert to the Nile in the customary four days. Back in Britain Elphinstone joined the campaign, promoted by the visionary new commander of the Bombay Marine (renamed the Indian Navy on 1 May 1830), Sir Charles Malcolm, to introduce steam to the Red Sea, which would enable boats to navigate up the Gulf of Suez against those tiresome northerlies.

Waghorn and other entrepreneurs in Britain and Egypt were meanwhile working at linking Mediterranean steam crossings (already overcoming its infuriating calms) with the Red Sea via an "overland route" through Egypt. An experimental vessel, HCS Hugh Lindsay, was built in Bombay Dockyard, powered by engines sent from England, and launched for Suez in 1829; a collier loaded with Welsh coal (sent via the Cape) went ahead, convoyed by a sailing brig, HCS Thetis. Captained by a real steam enthusiast, James Wilson, Hugh Lindsay made it to Suez in thirty-four days but the collier was later wrecked on a reef, a fate which narrowly missed befalling the Thetis, on a reef subsequently named after her, just south of Yanbu on the north Arabian coast.

== Elwon and Moresby begin the survey of the Red Sea ==
Drastic measures were clearly needed to prevent these disasters and a rather old ship and a brig were made ready for surveying work despite the reluctance of the East India Company in London to provide finance. The brig was HCS Palinurus, the same vessel that had transported the Elphinstone party to Qusayr in 1827. She was captained by Robert Moresby, who had already gained experience from having surveyed the Laccadive Islands. The ship HCS Benares was the senior vessel in charge of the survey under the captaincy of Thomas Elwon. Each vessel had a complement of about ten officers.

The two ships began the survey at Khor Shinab on the north Sudan coast, with Moresby and the Palinurus surveying the less known northern half of the Red Sea and Elwon in the less handy Benares dealing with the southern half. Moresby's data reveal the Palinurus criss-crossing the southern part of this area between Jiddah, Hurghada and Qusayr and up the Gulf of Suez during 1830 and 1831. In 1832 the Palinurus worked in the Gulf of Aqaba. Elwon in the Benares similarly criss-crossed the much more hazard-filled waters of the southern Arabian, Sudanese and Eritrean coasts. In 1832 Elwon was promoted Captain and rewarded with the dubious privilege of being appointed the Indian Navy's Commodore in the Red Sea, where he died in 1835 aged 41. Robert Moresby took over what was left of the work in the southern Red Sea. (Note: Sarah Searight, The Charting of the Red Sea. History Today, 2003)

It is claimed that from 1829 to 1833 Moresby never left the Red Sea, however the survey data indicate that each summer there was a cessation of activity from June to November, when it is probable the ships returned to India for rest and refit.

=== Survey of the Red Sea and its hazards ===
Between 1829 and 1833 the Bombay Marine's survey parties completed a full survey of the Red Sea in Benares and Palinurus. Moresby began his survey in the north, first along the Arabian coast around Jiddah, then across on the African coast north and south of Qusayr. However, in the Sailing Directions for the Red Sea compiled from the journals of Commander Elwon and his own, published in 1841 as part of Horsburgh's India Directory, 5th edition, the direction of the entries follows the south to north itinerary common since da Castro's day. Every detail is noted, not only reefs, harbours and anchorages but also provisions, the essential water (often awful) and fuel supplies. A fuller and more graphic narrative of the upper half of the survey is contained in Lieutenant James Raymond Wellsted's account, in the second volume of his Travels in Arabia (1838). Wellsted had joined the Palinurus in 1830. The reefs were mostly surveyed from local boats with local pilots, the names of the thirteen pilots embarked in the Benares from time to time appearing in Commander Elwon's journal.

This survey was an arduous task and the ships suffered. Palinurus had been forced to return to Bombay in 1830 for refitting after surveying the Gulf of Suez, while Benares had to be sent back in 1831 in a shattered state, the leaky tub caught forty-two times on coral reefs). "This heated funnel of reef-bound sea", as Moresby referred to it, took its toll on the surveyors; "great dangers and privations were inseparable from such a service", Moresby noted. The summer months were particularly punishing when temperatures reached the high 40°s and the Benares seems to have been especially vulnerable. It was rare for the full complement of officers to be functioning and Elwon himself was frequently ill. In 1833 the assistant surveyor, Lieutenant Pinching, died of smallpox off Aden Settlement where he was buried.

Moresby's narrative suggested that the triangulation started from Suez, as the nearest point to Cairo for those crossing Egypt by the Overland Route. However, the detailed journal in the British Hydrographic Office Archive suggests quite a different order, with both ships setting out from the middle and Moresby and the Palinurus going first to Jiddah, the confusion perhaps arises from the fact that the journal, comprising the two parts completed respectively by Moresby and Elwon, though signed and submitted to Sir Charles Malcolm by Elwon, was bound in the incorrect sequence. At Suez itself Moresby noted, "provisions are plentiful and good—oranges, pears, apples, plums in season. And there were plenty of fine cabbages!" In the Gulf there were some nasty spots whose names indicate the hazards—Moresby Shoal for instance, and Felix Jones Patches. Another danger spot was the Daedalus Shoal at the entrance to the Gulf of Suez, which has a light on it to this day. The most curious failing of Moresby's survey was his failure accurately to chart the position of El Akhawein, or The Brothers, an isolate reef in the middle of the northern half of the Red Sea, which he had not seen at all during his first investigations in 1831–32. Its position was not correctly established until the 1870s.

Moresby also surveyed the Gulf of Aqaba, a narrow deep waterway between high mountains that funnels high northerly winds. It was such winds, so frequently mentioned in the Sailing Directions, which the steam engine was supposed to overcome. The six-kilometre-wide entrance, at the Straits of Tiran, was bad enough—wrecks are strewn over the rocks there even today. In the Gulf itself on one occasion the Palinurus was blown off her anchorage three times, once despite having fifty fathoms (90 m) of chain down on each of two anchors.

Wellsted describes Moresby on one occasion springing up the rigging to spot reefs which everyone had declared were just wash from clashing tides; they lowered anchors to three fathoms but the vessel swung round and suddenly there was no bottom under the stem at eighty fathoms. In Wellsted's opinion four years in the Red Sea was nothing like as bad as 150 kilometres in the Gulf of Aqaba. On shore the crew helped locals repair their boats and Moresby going for a walk along the beach was accosted by fishermen whose boat had been thus mended, who insisted on his accepting a present of two sheep and a bag of dollars.

Heading out of the Gulf and down the Egyptian coast a particular danger spot was Zabargad Island (also known as St John's or Emerald Island because of ancient peridot mines); Palinurus was caught in a fearsome gale and only avoided being driven on to the rocks by hooking a kedge anchor on to a hole in the reef. "An uncomfortable night was spent by all."

Moresby always records the availability or otherwise of fuel, provisions, water, attitude of locals: availability of water was sometimes dependent on their being able to roll the ship's casks to and from the source. Onshore reception was variable owing to the long tradition of piracy in the northern end of the Red Sea. Moresby warned that "should a ship touch at any part of the Red Sea not frequented by Europeans (for water, etc.), great caution ought to be adopted, to guard against treachery from the various predatory tribes inhabiting the borders of the sea."

The coastal plain had been devastated earlier in the century by Wahhabi puritan Muslims from Central Arabia followed by an Egyptian invasion—none of this good news for non-Muslims. At Sharm Ghabur ('sharm' meaning a channel through the reefs in the local Arabic), where Muslim pilgrims traditionally donned their pilgrim's garb, "water and wood were cheap, and dates excellent, but the bedu were not to be trusted. They were feared throughout the sea for ferocity and treachery," writes Moresby, "so that it is dangerous to land on that stretch of shore."

During the survey of the Red Sea Robert Moresby was smitten by intermittent fevers. Finally Moresby returned to Bombay in 1833, exhausted by four years of surveying. Meanwhile, the valiant Palinurus sailed on to survey the southern coast of Arabia under Captain Stafford B. Haines, who would later become the first British official in charge of the Protectorate of Aden.

The Red Sea charts of Moresby and Elwon were drafted by chief draughtsman Felix Jones to a scale of one inch to the mile (in the trickier parts, ten inches to the mile), and published in 1834. They included two main sheets covering the whole sea, with two further sheets with detailed plans of anchorages. (Note: Sarah Searight, The Charting of the Red Sea. History Today, 2003)

== Other important surveys: the Maldives and the Chagos ==
After the completion of the Red Sea Survey, Robert Moresby was sent to chart various coral island groups lying across the track of India-to-Cape trade. In 1834–1836 Moresby, assisted by Lieutenants Christopher and Young, undertook the difficult cartography of the Maldive Islands, drawing the first accurate maritime charts of this complicated Indian Ocean atoll group (Admiralty Charts). These charts were printed as three separate large maps by the Hydrographic Service of the Royal Navy.

Nautical chart of the Chagos Archipelago from Moresby's 1837 survey

Moresby's survey of the Atolls of the Maldives was followed by the Chagos Archipelago. where he conducted "a thorough scientific survey". He planted 30 breadfruit trees in Diego Garcia Island, the largest of the group. Moresby reported that "there were cats and chickens on the island". Some of his observations were used by Darwin in his 1842 book The Structure and Distribution of Coral Reefs.

In 1838, after leaving the Chagos, Robert Moresby went on to survey the Saya de Malha bank. This is a vast submerged reef south-east of the Seychelles and since there is no island above the surface, the men were forced to spend many days at sea often under difficult weather conditions. Moresby could complete only part of this survey, namely the Southern Bank, for this arduous task and the accumulated fatigue from his previous surveys, took a toll on his health. Thus Robert Moresby had to interrupt the task and the Northern Bank of Saya da Malha could not be satisfactorily surveyed. He sailed then back to India, for a much-needed time of rest for him and his crew.

Even after the necessary period of relaxation, Moresby did not fully recover. Finally his precarious condition obliged him to give up surveying.

In 1842 he was employed by the Peninsular and Oriental Steam Navigation Company (P&O), to command their brand new and most luxurious steamer, Hindostan, on her maiden voyage from Southampton to Calcutta. Subsequently, the Hindostan was employed on the Calcutta-Suez run, the Red Sea now made safe by the immaculate surveys led by Elwon and Moresby.

Moresby's charts were so good that they were favoured by Maldivian pilots navigating through the treacherous waters of their atolls until the 1990s, when satellite images appeared. In the Maldives a channel locally also known as Hanikandu, between Northern Maalhosmadulhu Atoll and "Fasdhūtere" Atoll, is still known as 'Moresby Channel' in the honor of this forgotten captain and draughtsman, who with much patience and hard work charted all the Atolls of the Maldives. (Note: Xavier Romero-Frias, The Maldive Islanders, A Study of the Popular Culture of an Ancient Ocean Kingdom. Barcelona 1999)

Moresby Island, an island in Peros Banhos Atoll in the Chagos Archipelago, has been named after this skilled British cartographer as well. However, Robert Moresby should not be confused with Admiral Sir Fairfax Moresby, of the Royal Navy or Fairfax Moresby's son, Rear-Admiral John Moresby, after whom Port Moresby, the capital of Papua New Guinea, was named. Fairfax Moresby was related to Robert Moresby by the same father, but he is not mentioned by John Moresby as an uncle in that officer's biography of himself and his father, Two Admirals, Admiral of the Fleet, Sir Fairfax Moresby (1786-1877), and His Son, John Moresby.

== Sir Richard Burton's eulogy ==
Robert Moresby, the genius of the Red Sea, conducted also the survey of the Maldive Islands and groups known as the Chagos Archipelago. He narrowly escaped being a victim to the deleterious climate of his station, and only left it when no longer capable of working. A host of young and ardent officers, Christopher, Young, Powell, Campbell, Jones, Barker, and others, ably seconded him: death was busy amongst them for months and so paralyzed by disease were the living, that the anchors could scarcely be raised for a retreat to the coast of India. Renovated by a three-months' stay, occasionally in port, where they were strengthened by additional numbers, the undaunted remnants from time to time returned to their task; and in 1837, gave to the world a knowledge of those singular groups which heretofore "though within 150 miles of our coasts" had been a mystery hidden within the dangers that environed them. The beautiful maps of the Red Sea, drafted by the late Commodore Carless, then a lieutenant, will ever remain permanent monuments of Indian Naval Science, and the daring of its officers and men. Those of the Maldive and Chagos groups, executed by Commander then Acting Lieutenant Felix Jones, were, we hear, of such a high order, that they were deemed worthy of special inspection by the Queen. (Note: Burton, Richard. First footsteps in East Africa)

== See also ==
- Cartography
- Hydrography
- List of cartographers
