= Maamigili (Raa Atoll) =

- Uninhabited island
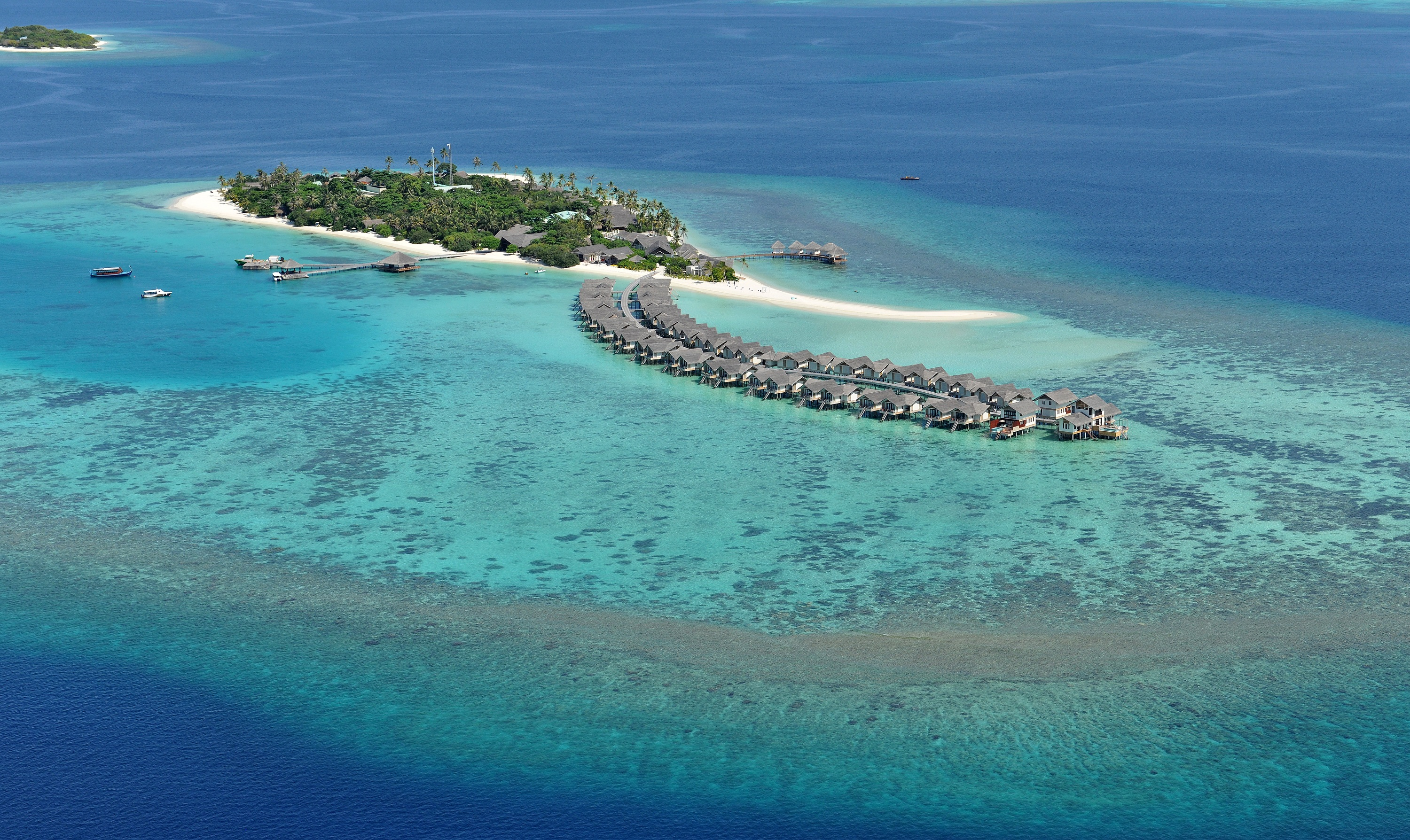
- Aerial shot of Maamigili Island

- Location in Maldives
- Coordinates: 05°40′05″N 72°52′30″E
- Country: Maldives
- Administrative atoll: Northern Maalhosmadulhu Atoll
- Distance to Malé: 186.92 km (116.15 mi)

Dimensions
  - Length: 0.700 km (0.435 mi)
  - Width: 0.500 km (0.311 mi)
- Time zone: UTC+05:00 (MST)

Maamigili is one of the uninhabited islands of Raa Atoll in the Maldives. The island measures 750 meters in length and 500 meters in width for 100 hectares of coral reef.

The island has three notable buildings. Loama Resort Maldives at Maamigili is a resort situated on the island. It has a collection of historical artifacts placed at Loama Museum. Loama Art Gallery is also created to show contemporary local art.

== Loama Museum ==
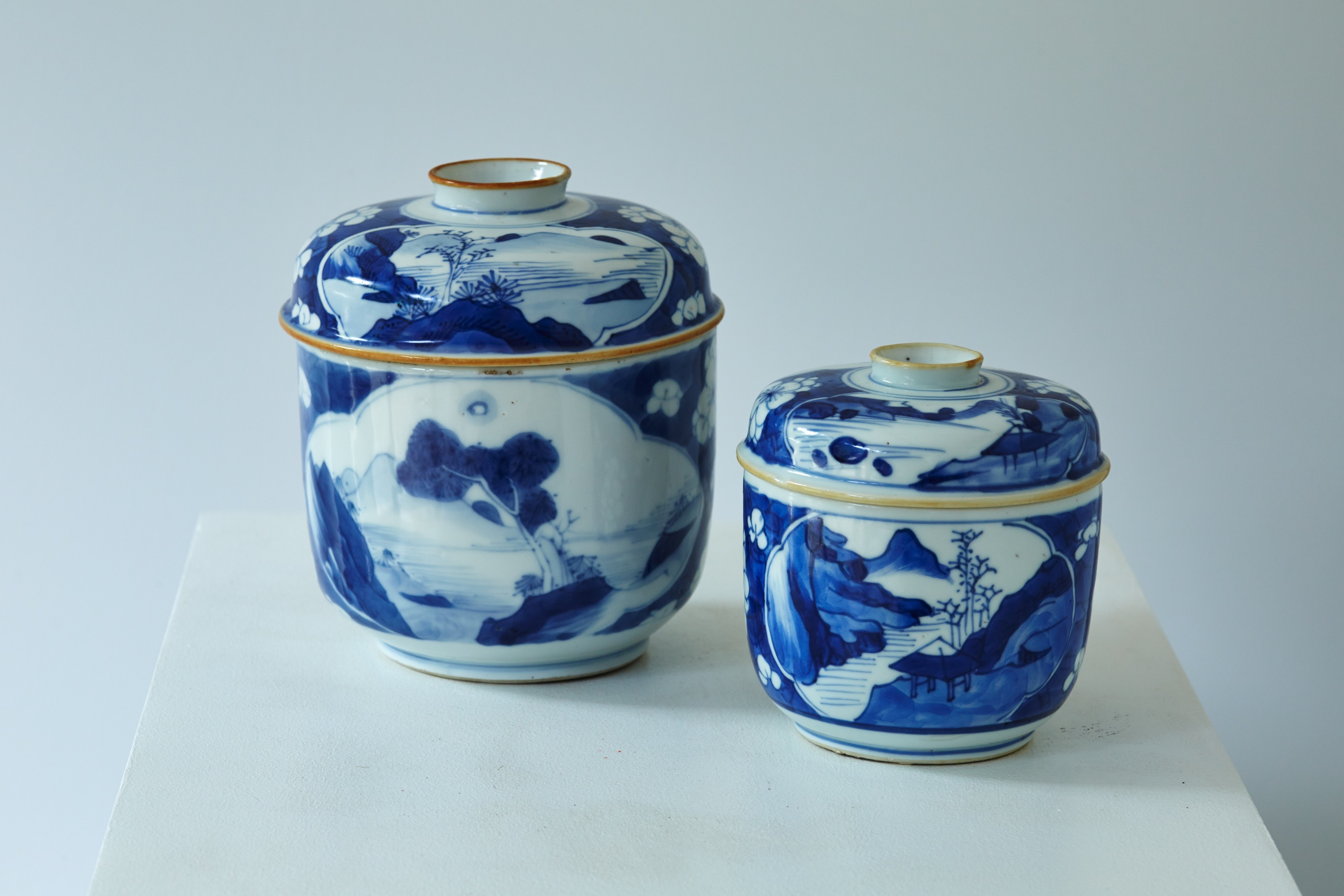
Porcelain jar decorated with Chinese mountain scenes, prunus flowers and religious objects

The Loama Museum collection spans from the classical to the British colonial periods. These include native artifacts, foreign objects from the Early Modern or colonial period (1514–1828) and British colonial period (1828–1965), a bath from the classical period (500 BCE – 1153), and mausoleums from the Medieval Islamic period (1153–1514). The museum leads to ancient baths and a traditional house, which are located at the heritage site.

Exhibits include Chinese porcelain that arrived during the Indian Ocean trade between Southeast Asia and the Middle East. Other artifacts from the collection represent the lifestyle of these coral atolls for centuries in the Indian Ocean and include grain measures, coconut oil production methods, and equipment for lace.

=== Traditional house ===
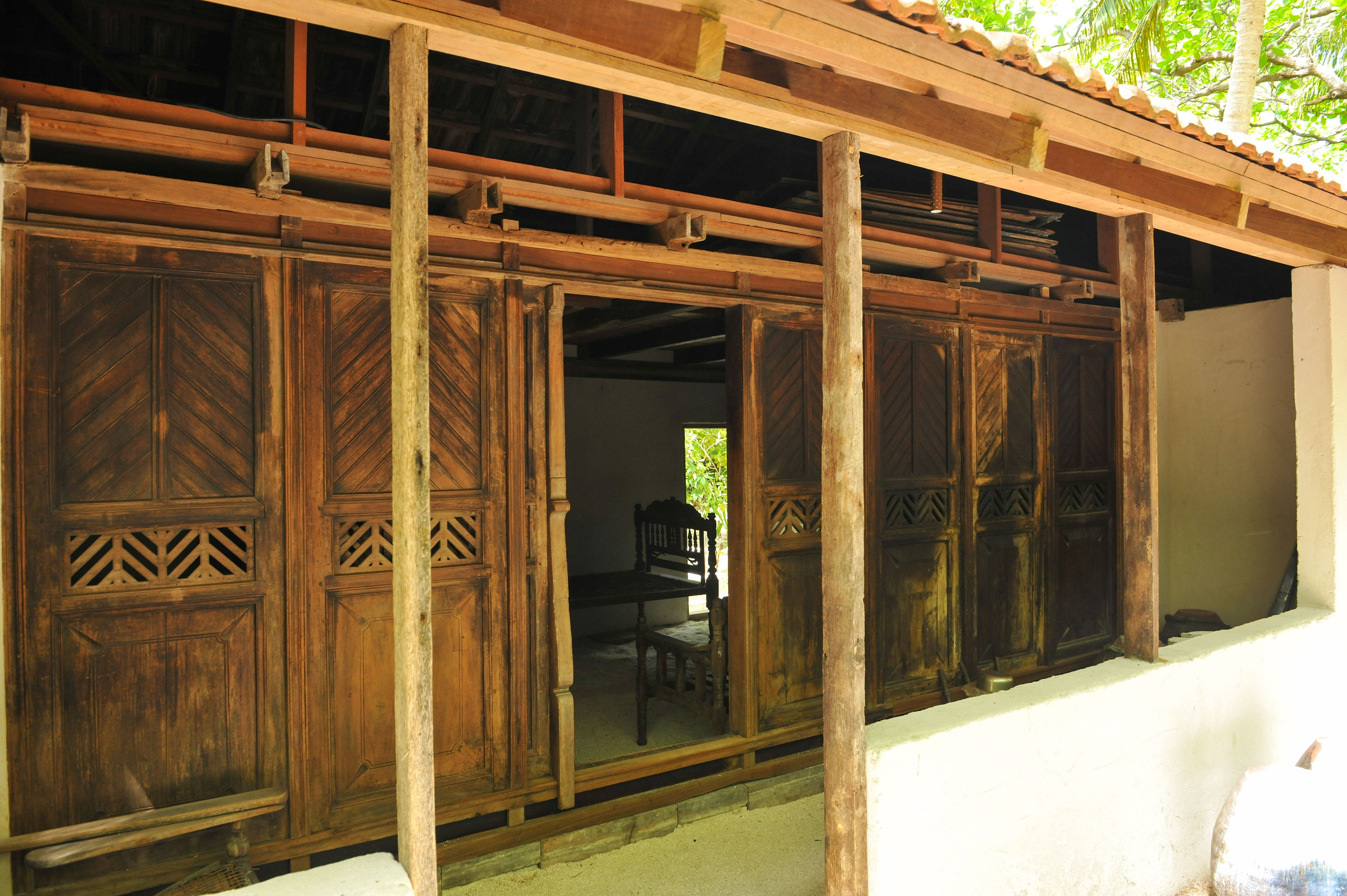
A traditional Maldivian house at Loama Resort Maldives, Maamigili

Loama Museum shows a traditional Maldivian house with a history spanning over 125 years in Kandholhudhoo. The house features teak panels and coral stone walls. Its dimensions are approximately 20 feet by 12 feet, and it is furnished with items for daily living.

== Vevu ==
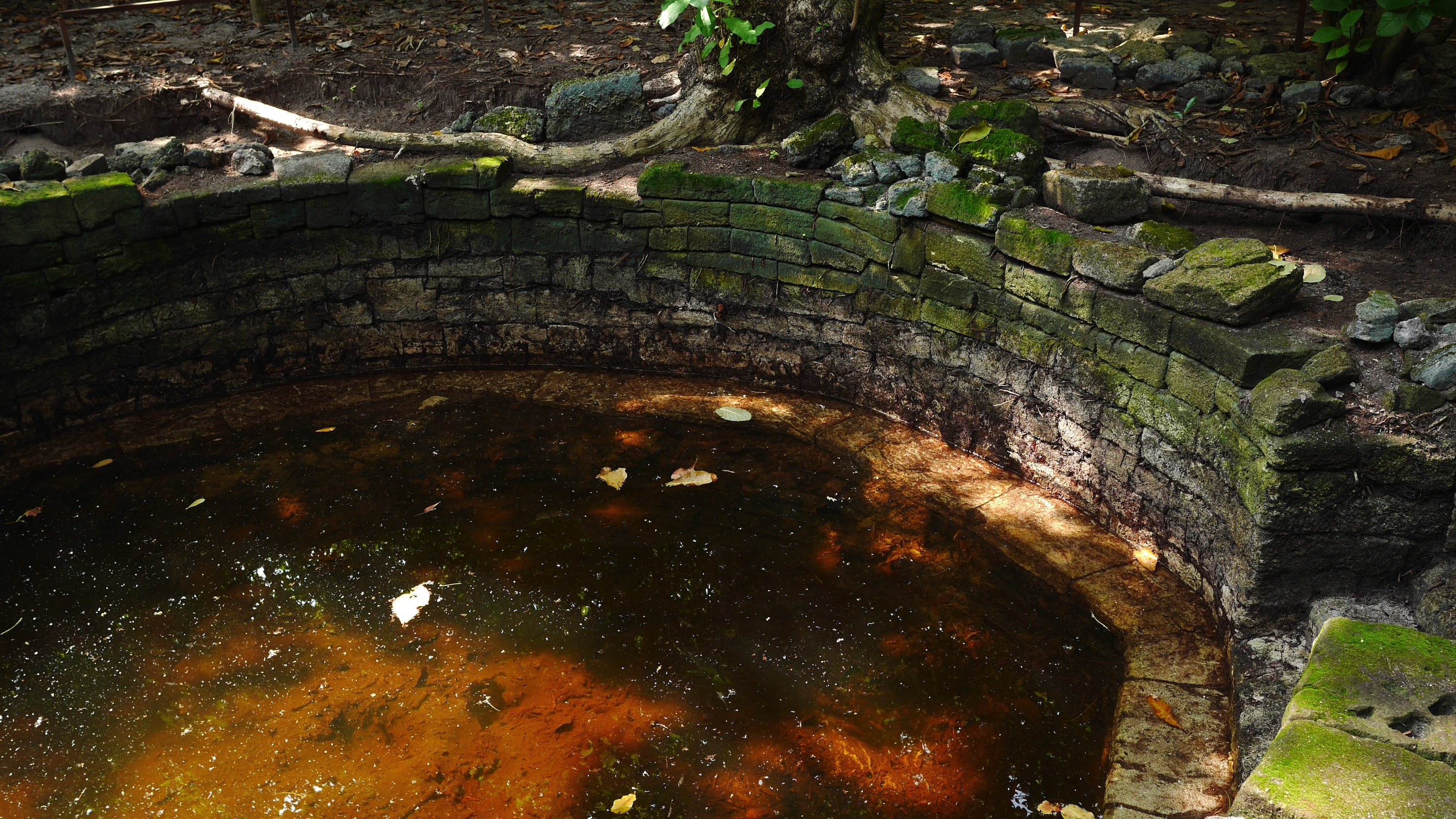
Vevu were used as public baths and later for ablution

Vevu (Dhivehi), also known as bathing tanks, were historically used as public baths and later for ablution. The construction period of these Vevu is uncertain, but the use of sandstone indicates a possibility in the pre-Islamic era (500 BCE – 1153 CE). The symmetrical layout suggests a potential association with a temple. Similar baths can be found in other parts of the Maldives, some also featuring coral stone. The Vevu's construction involved layering sandstone blocks below the waterline, up to half a meter above the ground. An octagonal ledge was cantilevered at low tide level to facilitate access to the well.

== See also ==
- National Museum (Maldives)
- History of the Maldives
- Culture of the Maldives
- Islam in the Maldives
- Buddhism in the Maldives
