= INS Memnon =

East India Company ship

History

India
- Operator: Indian Navy
- Builder: Fletcher, Son & Fearnall, Limehouse
- Launched: 1841
- Fate: Wrecked 1 August 1843

General characteristics
- Type: Paddle steamer
- Tons burthen: 1,140 (bm)
- Armament: 2 × 68-pounder guns + 4 × 32-pounder guns
- Notes: An important source for EIC vessels mistakenly gives Memnon's launch year as 1843 and mistakenly states that she was wrecked on her maiden voyage.

INS Memnon was a steam paddle frigate launched on the Thames in 1841 for the Indian Navy of the British East India Company (EIC). She was wrecked in August 1843.

On 22 June 1842 Memnon, Commander F.T.Powell, arrived at Singapore, direct from England. At the time the United Kingdom was engaged in the First Opium War so Memmnon proceeded to Hong Kong. She did not proceed beyond Chusan and so did not participate in the subsequent operations of the war.

Memnon arrived at Bombay from Hong Kong 26 January 1843. The EIC then used her to carry mail to and from Suez. On what would be her last voyage she left Bombay 22 July.

Memnon was wrecked on 1 August 1843 off Cape Guardafui, Majerteen Sultanate, while on a voyage from Bombay to Suez. After many tribulations the crew were able to send a boat with some men that reached Aden on 25 August. The EIC's Political Agent immediately dispatched INS Tigris, which rescued the remainder of the crew.

All 170 crew and passengers were rescued. HCS Palinurus conducted salvage operations between October 1843 and June 1844.
