= 2012 Dhivehi League Round 2 =

In Round 2, all eight teams play against each other. A total of 28 matches will be played in this round.

== League table ==
| Pos | Team | Pld | W | D | L | GF | GA | GD | Pts |
|---|---|---|---|---|---|---|---|---|---|
| 1 | New Radiant SC | 4 | 3 | 1 | 0 | 11 | 2 | +9 | 10 |
| 2 | VB Addu FC | 3 | 3 | 0 | 0 | 18 | 6 | +12 | 9 |
| 3 | Club All Youth Linkage | 3 | 2 | 0 | 1 | 5 | 6 | -1 | 6 |
| 4 | Maziya S&RC | 3 | 1 | 1 | 1 | 3 | 2 | -3 | 3 |
| 5 | Vyansa | 3 | 1 | 0 | 2 | 1 | 9 | -8 | 3 |
| 6 | Club Eagles | 3 | 0 | 2 | 1 | 1 | 2 | -1 | 2 |
| 7 | Victory SC | 3 | 0 | 2 | 1 | 3 | 4 | -1 | 2 |
| 8 | Club Valencia | 4 | 0 | 0 | 4 | 1 | 10 | -9 | 0 |

== Matches ==
| 5 June 2012 1 | New Radiant Sports Club | 0–0 | Victory Sports Club | Rasmee Dhandu Stadium, Malé |
| 16:05 | Niyaz (yellow card) 64' | Report (by FAM); Report (in English); Report (in Dhivehi) | (yellow card) 67' Firaz | Referee: Mohamed Fareed |

| 6 June 2012 2 | Club Eagles | 0–0 | Maziya Sports and Recreation Club | Rasmee Dhandu Stadium, Malé |
| 21:00 | | Report (by FAM); Report (in English); Report (in Dhivehi) | | Referee: Ali Saleem |

| 7 June 2012 3 | Club Valencia | 0–1 | Vyansa | Rasmee Dhandu Stadium, Malé |
| 16:05 | | Report (by FAM); Report (in English); Report (in Dhivehi) | 82' Muhaimin | Referee: Mohamed Fareed |

| 7 June 2012 4 | VB Addu FC | 6–1 | Club All Youth Linkage | Rasmee Dhandu Stadium, Malé |
| 21:00 | Nashid 7', 25', 32', 76'; Shamweel 28'; Abu 83' | Report (by FAM); Report (in English); Report (in Dhivehi) | 82' Lareef | Referee: Zaeem Ali |

| 10 June 2012 5 | New Radiant Sports Club | 5–1 | Maziya Sports and Recreation Club | Rasmee Dhandu Stadium, Malé |
| 16:05 | Ahmed Abdulla 24' (pen.); Ashfaq 28', 89'; Umar (yellow card) 45+?'; Thoriq 77', 88' | Report (by FAM); Report (in English); Report (in Dhivehi) | 11' Niyaz; (yellow card) 76' A. Niyaz | Referee: Ahmed Aslam |

| 11 June 2012 6 | Vyansa | 0–6 | VB Addu FC | Rasmee Dhandu Stadium, Malé |
| 16:05 | | Report (by FAM); Report (in English); Report (in Dhivehi) | 1', 73' Abu; 5', 30' Nashid; 14' Charles; 53' Shamweel | Referee: Ali Saleem |

| 11 June 2012 7 | Victory Sports Club | 1–1 | Club Eagles | Rasmee Dhandu Stadium, Malé |
| 21:00 | Adhuham 15' | Report (by FAM); Report (in English); Report (in Dhivehi) | 42' Shinaz | Referee: Zaeem Ali |

| 12 June 2012 8 | Club Valencia | 0–1 | Club All Youth Linkage | Rasmee Dhandu Stadium, Malé |
| 16:05 | Irufaan (yellow card) 79'; Mahir (yellow card) 87' | Report (by FAM); Report (in English); Report (in Dhivehi) | (yellow card) 24' Moosa; 45' Lareef | Referee: Zaeem Ali |

| 10 July 2012 9 | New Radiant Sports Club | 1–0 | Club Eagles | Rasmee Dhandu Stadium, Malé |
| 14:00 | Karamanov (yellow card) 21'; Umar 37' | Report (by FAM); Report (in English); Report (in Dhivehi) | | Referee: Ahmed Aslam |

| 11 July 2012 10 | Club Valencia | 5–6 | VB Addu FC | Rasmee Dhandu Stadium, Malé |
| 14:00 | Visham 8', 18' (yellow card) 12'; Hamdhaan 39'; A. Imran (yellow card) 56'; Mahir (yellow card) 76'; Wahid 65'; Charles 90' | Report (by FAM); Report (in English); Report (in Dhivehi) | 4', 30', 77' (pen.) Shamweel; (red card) 17' Fairooz; 27', 32', 52' Abu; (yellow card) 83' Ashfan | Referee: Ali Shifan |

| 12 July 2012 11 | Victory Sports Club | 2–3 | Maziya Sports and Recreation Club | Rasmee Dhandu Stadium, Malé |
| 14:00 | Shafiu (yellow card) 41' (yellow-red card) 90+?'; Umair 66', 88'; Mohamed (yellow card) 82' | Report (by FAM); Report (in English) [ Report (in Dhivehi)] | 11', 21', 49' Assadhulla; (yellow card) 66' Ahmed. M. (yellow card) 88'Shiyaam | Referee: Ali Saleem |

| 13 July 2012 12 | Vyansa | 0–3 | Club All Youth Linkage | Rasmee Dhandu Stadium, Malé |
| 14:00 | Usam (yellow card) 8' | Report (by FAM); Report (in English); Report (in Dhivehi) | 26' Stephane; (yellow card) 53' Nimal; (yellow card) 76' Lareef; 81' Modo; 90+?' Amir | Referee: Ahmed Aslam |

| 15 July 2012 13 | New Radiant Sports Club | 5–1 | Club Valencia | Rasmee Dhandu Stadium, Malé |
| 14:00 | Karamanov 20'; Ashfaq 23', 84'; Thoriq 51', 73' | Report (by FAM); Report (in English); Report (in Dhivehi) | (yellow card) 27' (goal) 67' Charles; (yellow card) 55' (yellow-red card) 90+?' Irufan | Referee: Ibrahim Thaufeeq |

| 16 July 2012 14 | Club Eagles | 1–4 | VB Addu FC | Rasmee Dhandu Stadium, Malé |
| 14:00 | Arif (yellow card) 45'; Hamdhaan (yellow card) 65'; Haneef (yellow card) 76'; Musthafa 79' | Report (by FAM); Report (in English); Report (in Dhivehi) | (yellow card) 20' (goal) 67' Cengiz; 38' Shamweel; (yellow card) 45+?' (goal) 87' Abu; 50' Ismail; (yellow card) 79' Faruhadh | Referee: Ahmed Afsah |

| 17 July 2012 15 | Victory Sports Club | 2–0 | Vyansa | Rasmee Dhandu Stadium, Malé |
| 14:00 | Umair 56', 82' | Report (by FAM); Report (in English); Report (in Dhivehi) | | Referee: Zaeem Ali |

| 18 July 2012 16 | Maziya Sports and Recreation Club | 2–0 | Club All Youth Linkage | Rasmee Dhandu Stadium, Malé |
| 14:00 | Niyaz (yellow card) 22' (goal) 69'; Ahmed. M 79' | Report (by FAM); Report (in English); Report (in Dhivehi) | (yellow card) 32' Amir | Referee: Ahmed Shifan |

| 29 July 2012 17 | Victory Sports Club | 1–2 | VB Addu FC | Rasmee Dhandu Stadium, Malé |
| 22:00 | Akram 90+?' | Report (by FAM); Report (in English); Report (in Dhivehi) | (yellow card) 42' Jameel; 57', 66' Cengiz | Referee: Ahmed Aslam |

| 30 July 2012 18 | Club Eagles | – | Club All Youth Linkage | Rasmee Dhandu Stadium, Malé |
| 22:00 | | [ Report (by FAM)] [ Report (in English)] [ Report (in Dhivehi)] |

| 31 July 2012 19 | New Radiant Sports Club | – | Vyansa | Rasmee Dhandu Stadium, Malé |
| 22:00 | | [ Report (by FAM)] [ Report (in English)] [ Report (in Dhivehi)] |

| 1 August 2012 20 | Maziya Sports and Recreation Club | – | Club Valencia | Rasmee Dhandu Stadium, Malé |
| 22:00 | | [ Report (by FAM)] [ Report (in English)] [ Report (in Dhivehi)] |

| 4 August 2012 21 | Victory Sports Club | – | Club All Youth Linkage | Rasmee Dhandu Stadium, Malé |
| 22:00 | | [ Report (by FAM)] [ Report (in English)] [ Report (in Dhivehi)] |

| 5 August 2012 22 | Maziya Sports and Recreation Club | – | Vyansa | Rasmee Dhandu Stadium, Malé |
| 22:00 | | [ Report (by FAM)] [ Report (in English)] [ Report (in Dhivehi)] |

| 6 August 2012 23 | New Radiant Sports Club | – | VB Addu FC | Rasmee Dhandu Stadium, Malé |
| 22:00 | | [ Report (by FAM)] [ Report (in English)] [ Report (in Dhivehi)] |

| 7 August 2012 24 | Club Eagles | – | Club Valencia | Rasmee Dhandu Stadium, Malé |
| 22:00 | | [ Report (by FAM)] [ Report (in English)] [ Report (in Dhivehi)] |

| 10 August 2012 25 | Maziya Sports and Recreation Club | – | VB Addu FC | Rasmee Dhandu Stadium, Malé |
| 22:00 | | [ Report (by FAM)] [ Report (in English)] [ Report (in Dhivehi)] |

| 11 August 2012 26 | New Radiant Sports Club | – | Club All Youth Linkage | Rasmee Dhandu Stadium, Malé |
| 22:00 | | [ Report (by FAM)] [ Report (in English)] [ Report (in Dhivehi)] |

| 12 August 2012 27 | Victory Sports Club | – | Club Valencia | Rasmee Dhandu Stadium, Malé |
| 22:00 | | [ Report (by FAM)] [ Report (in English)] [ Report (in Dhivehi)] |

| 13 August 2012 28 | Club Eagles | – | Vyansa | Rasmee Dhandu Stadium, Malé |
| 22:00 | | [ Report (by FAM)] [ Report (in English)] [ Report (in Dhivehi)] |

== Round 2 statistics ==
=== Scorers ===
| Rank | Player | Club | Goals |
|---|---|---|---|
| 1 | (Maldives) Ahmed Nashid | VB Addu FC | 6 |
| 1 | (Sierra Leone) Abu Desmond Mansaray | VB Addu FC | 6 |
| 1 | (Maldives) Shamweel Qasim | VB Addu FC | 6 |
| 2 | (Maldives) Ali Ashfaq | New Radiant SC | 4 |
| 2 | (Maldives) Ahmed Thoriq | New Radiant SC | 4 |
| 2 | (Maldives) Mohamed Umair | Victory SC | 4 |
| 3 | (Maldives) Assadhulla Abdulla | Maziya S&RC | 3 |
| 3 | (Liberia) Wright Charles Gaye | 1 for VB Addu FC, 2 for Club Valencia | 3 |
| 3 | (Netherlands) Hüseyin Cengiz | VB Addu FC | 3 |
| 4 | (Maldives) Adam Lareef | Club All Youth Linkage | 2 |
| 4 | (Maldives) Ahmed Visham | Club Valencia | 2 |
| 4 | (Maldives) Hussan Niyaz Mohamed | Maziya S&RC | 2 |
| 5 | (Maldives) Abdul Muhaimin Mohamed | Vyansa | 1 |
| 5 | (Maldives) Ahmed Abdulla | New Radiant SC | 1 |
| 5 | (Maldives) Hassan Adhuham | Victory SC | 1 |
| 5 | (Maldives) Shinaz Hilmy | Club Eagles | 1 |
| 5 | (Maldives) Ali Umar | New Radiant SC | 1 |
| 5 | (Maldives) Ibrahim Hamdhaan | Club Valencia | 1 |
| 5 | (Maldives) Abdul Wahid Ibrahim | Club Valencia | 1 |
| 5 | UNK Bougha Loga Stephane | Club All Youth Linkage | 1 |
| 5 | UNK Modo Hugues | Club All Youth Linkage | 1 |
| 5 | (Maldives) Mohamed Amir | Club All Youth Linkage | 1 |
| 5 | (Bulgaria) Ivan Atanasov Karamanov | New Radiant SC | 1 |
| 5 | (Maldives) Ismail Mohamed | VB Addu FC | 1 |
| 5 | (Maldives) Musthafa Abdul Kareem | Club Eagles | 1 |
| 5 | (Maldives) Ahmed Mohamed | Maziya S&RC | 1 |

=== Assists ===
| Rank | Player | Club | Assists |
|---|---|---|---|
| 1 | (Sierra Leone) Abu Desmond Mansaray | VB Addu FC | 5 |
| 1 | (Liberia) Wright Charles Gaye | 1 for VB Addu FC, 2 for Club Valencia | 3 |
| 1 | (Maldives) Ibrahim Hamdhaan | Club Valencia | 3 |
| 1 | (Maldives) Hussan Niyaz Mohamed | Maziya S&RC | 3 |
| 1 | (Maldives) Ahmed Nashid | VB Addu FC | 3 |
| 2 | (Maldives) Shamweel Qasim | VB Addu FC | 2 |
| 2 | (Netherlands) Hüseyin Cengiz | VB Addu FC | 2 |
| 3 | (Maldives) Mohamed Hussain | VB Addu FC | 1 |
| 3 | (Maldives) Abdulla Muaz | Club All youth Linkage | 1 |
| 3 | (Maldives) Ali Ashfaq | New Radiant SC | 1 |
| 3 | (Brazil) Everton Souza Santos | Club All youth Linkage | 1 |
| 3 | (Maldives) Adam Lareef | Club All youth Linkage | 1 |
| 3 | (Maldives) Ali Umar | New Radiant SC | 1 |
| 3 | (Maldives) Ahmed Thoriq | New Radiant SC | 1 |
| 3 | (Maldives) Ahmed Niyaz | New Radiant SC | 1 |
| 3 | (Maldives) Ahmed Visham | Club Valencia | 1 |
| 3 | (Bulgaria) Ivan Atanasov Karamanov | New Radiant SC | 1 |
| 3 | (Maldives) Ibrahim Fazeel | New Radiant SC | 1 |
| 3 | (Maldives) Ali Nafiu | VB Addu FC | 1 |
| 3 | (Cameroon) Hansley Awilo | Victory SC | 1 |
| 3 | (Maldives) Fauzan Habeeb | Victory SC | 1 |
| 3 | (Maldives) Ahmed Mohamed | Maziya S&RC | 1 |
| 3 | (Maldives) Ismail Mohamed | VB Addu FC | 1 |

=== Hat-tricks ===
| Player | For | Against | Result | Date |
|---|---|---|---|---|
| (Maldives) Ahmed Nashid^{4} | VB Addu FC | Club All Youth Linkage | 6–1 | 7 June 2012 |
| (Maldives) Abu Desmond Mansaray | VB Addu FC | Club Valencia | 5–6 | 11 July 2012 |
| (Maldives) Shamweel Qasim | VB Addu FC | Club Valencia | 5–6 | 11 July 2012 |
| (Maldives) Assadhulla Abdulla | Maziya S&RC | Victory SC | 2–3 | 12 July 2012 |

- ^{4} Player scored 4 goals

=== Clean sheets ===
- Clean sheets by Club:
  - New Radiant SC (2)
  - Club All Youth Linkage (2)
  - Victory SC (2)
  - Maziya S&RC (2)
  - Club Eagles (1)
  - Vyansa (1)
  - VB Addu FC (1)
  - Club Valencia (0)
- Clean sheets by goalkeepers:
  - Imran Mohamed (New Radiant SC) (2)
  - Ibrahim Siyad (Club All Youth Linkage) (2)
  - Lavent Vanli (Victory SC) (2)
  - Mohamed Imran (Maziya S&RC) (2)
  - Abdulla Ziyazan (VB Addu FC) (2)
  - Mohamed Yamaan (Club Eagles) (1)
  - Alexander Osei Domfeh (Vyansa) (1)
  - Ibrahim Ifrah Areef (Club Valencia) (0)
  - Hussain Habeeb (VB Addu FC) (0)
  - Mohamed Saruhan (Club Valencia) (0)
  - Mohamed Nishah (Victory SC) (0)
