= 2004 Maldives FA Cup =

Maldives FA Cup
Tournament details
- Country: Maldives

Final positions
- Champions: Club Valencia
- Runner-up: Victory Sports Club

Tournament statistics
- Matches played: 19
- Goals scored: 111 (5.84 per match)

The 2004 Maldives FA Cup, was the 17th edition of the Maldives FA Cup.

== Qualifying rounds ==
=== First round ===
1 March 2004

FC Cicada	5–1	SC Veloxia

Henveiru Football Ground, Malé

6 March 2004

Hilaaly SC	1–2	FC Baaz
Hassan Niyas 24'		27' Saeed Abdulla; 90+5' Ibrahim Ali

Henveiru Football Ground, Malé

10 March 2004

Dhiyamigili ZJ	1–11	Maziya
Hathim Ibrahim 44'		6' Mohamed Shafreen; 12', 18', 35', 41' Ahmed Afrad; 14', 20', 49' Akram Ramzee; 45' Ahmed Farhan; 54' Ismail Mohamed; 76' Ishaq Mohamed

Henveiru Football Ground, Malé

14 March 2004

New Star	4–3	United Victory
Ahmed Shakeeb 18'; Ahmed Fayaz 21'; Ali Shahid 49'; Ali Shahid 75'		23' (o.g.) Ahmed Shaaiq; 59' Jadullah Hassan; 80' Ali Faaiz

Henveiru Football Ground, Malé

16 March 2004

BG Sports Club	2–6	Vyansa
Ahmed Mamdhooh 20'; Mohamed Haisam 52'		44' Ahmed Naeem; 52' Yoosuf Niyaz; 76', 81', 82' Mohamed Rasheed; 89' Nazwar Ismail

Henveiru Football Ground, Malé

=== Second round ===
21 March 2004

Club Gaamagu	1–11	FC Cicada
Ibrahim Shareef 67'		15' Ali Shian; 21' (o.g.) Ibrahim Haleem; 24' Ahmed Shayaz; 28', 30', 66', 69', 84' Hussein Abdul Rahman; 45', 76' Shifaz Ahmed; 81' Ahmed Irufan

Henveiru Football Ground, Malé

22 March 2004

Maziya	2–1	FC Baaz
Ahmed Farhan 17'; Ahmed Suzain 90+1'		59' Ahmed Rasheed

Henveiru Football Ground, Malé

23 March 2004

Club Eagles	5–1	New Star
Mohamed Muaz 20'; Mohamed Ziyad 30', 75'; Mohamed Rameez 63'; Ibrahim Anil 79'		90+3' (pen.) Ahmed Fazeen

Henveiru Football Ground, Malé

2 April 2004

SC Mecano	3–1	Vyansa
Ibrahim Mamnoon 13'; Ahmed Shakir 46'; Ahmed Irushan 90+1'		6' Mohamed Rasheed

Henveiru Football Ground, Malé

=== Third Round ===
3 April 2004

FC Cicada	1–3	Maziya
Hussein Abdul Rahman 86'		27' Nazim Naseer; 75' Akram Ramzee; 83' Ishaq Mohamed

Henveiru Football Ground, Malé

4 April 2004

Club Eagles	1–2	SC Mecano
Mohamed Shujau 90+2'		30' Ibrahim Mamnoon; 73' Ahmed Irushan

Henveiru Football Ground, Malé

== Quarter-finals ==
10 April 2004

Island FC	3–0	Maziya
Ahmed Sunain 65', 78', 82'

Gaumee Football Dhan'du, Malé

11 April 2004

Victory Sports Club	4–0	Guraidhoo Z.J.
Ibrahim Shiyam 45'; Adam Lareef 58'; Hussain Habeeb 65'; Oronji O. Patrick 90+2'

Gaumee Football Dhan'du, Malé

12 April 2004

New Radiant	2–0	Hurriyya SC
Boyko Kamenov ?'; Ibrahim Fazeel 45'

Gaumee Football Dhan'du, Malé

14 April 2004

Club Valencia	11–1	SC Mecano
Ali Ashfaq 6', 42' (pen.); Adam Abdul Latheef 10'; Abdulla Waheed 26', 45'; Assad Abdul Ghanee 57' (pen.); Hassan Mahid 64', 84'; Mohamed Zahid 87'; Mohamed Nizam 90+1'; Ismail Mahfooz 90+4'		80' Ibrahim Nisham

Gaumee Football Dhan'du, Malé

== Semi-finals ==
16 April 2004

Victory Sports Club	5–1	Island FC
Ibrahim Shiyam 2', 13'; Oronji O. Patrick 35', 45', 90+3'		22' Ashraf Luthfy

Gaumee Football Dhan'du, Malé

17 April 2004

Club Valencia	3–2	New Radiant
Ali Ashfaq 21' (pen.); Adam Abdul Latheef 37', 76'		58', 88' Ahmed Thariq

Gaumee Football Dhan'du, Malé

== Third place play-off ==
25 April 2004

Island FC	5–4	New Radiant
Shamweel Qasim 7'; Ismail Mohamed 14', 37'; Fareed Mohamed 33'; Ali Umar 75'		21', 30', 75', 94' Ahmed Thariq

Gaumee Football Dhan'du, Malé

== Final ==
26 April 2004

Club Valencia	2–0	Victory Sports Club
Adam Abdul Latheef 18'; Ibrahim Sinaz 59' (o.g.)

Gaumee Football Dhan'du, Malé
