= 2012 Dhivehi League Round 1 =

In Round 1, all eight teams play against each other. A total of 28 matches will be played in this round.

== League table ==
Pos	Team	Pld	W	D	L	GF	GA	GD	Pts
1	New Radiant SC	7	5	2	0	17	2	+15	17
2	Victory SC	7	5	1	1	19	10	+9	16
3	Club Eagles	7	3	2	2	10	11	-1	11
4	Maziya S&RC	7	3	1	3	11	9	+2	10
5	Club Valencia	7	2	1	4	6	14	-8	7
6	Vyansa	7	1	3	3	6	7	-1	6
7	VB Addu FC	7	1	3	3	11	14	-3	6
8	Club All Youth Linkage	7	1	1	5	4	17	-13	4

== Matches ==
18 April 2012 1	VB Addu FC	0–4	New Radiant Sports Club	Rasmee Dhandu Stadium, Malé
21:00	Cengiz (yellow card) 51'; Fairooz (yellow card) 56'; Sobah (yellow card) 63'	Report (by FAM); Report (in English); Report (in Dhivehi)	19', 68', 90+4' Ashfaq; (yellow card) 67' Fazeel; 90+1' Thoriq	Referee: Mohamed Fareed

19 April 2012 2	Victory Sports Club	3–2	Maziya Sports & Recreation Club	Rasmee Dhandu Stadium, Malé
16:00	Awilo 10'; Kaka (yellow card) 26'; Akram 45+1'; Shaffaz 45+3' (yellow card) 76'; Rilwan (yellow card) 77'	Report (by FAM); Report (in English); Report (in Dhivehi)	16' Ahmed; 20' Assadhulla	Referee: Ahmed Aslam

20 April 2012 3	Club Eagles	1–0	Vyansa	Rasmee Dhandu Stadium, Malé
16:00	Shinaz 75'; A. Rilwan (yellow card) 75'	Report (by FAM); Report (in English); Report (in Dhivehi)	(yellow card) 34' Muhaimin; (yellow card) 71' H. Fairooz	Referee: Ali Saleem

21 April 2012 4	Club Valencia	1–0	Club All Youth Linkage	Rasmee Dhandu Stadium, Malé
16:00	Salomon (yellow card) 45+2' (goal) 71'; Fuhaid (yellow card) 62'; A. Imran (yellow card) 89'	Report (by FAM); Report (in English); Report (in Dhivehi)	(yellow card) 45' Amir; (yellow card) 71' Lareef	Referee: Ahmed Afsah

27 April 2012 5	Maziya Sports & Recreation Club	3–0	Club Valencia	Rasmee Dhandu Stadium, Malé
16:00	Ahmed 18'; Asadhulla 32', 62'; Ahmed Zubair (yellow card) 86'	Report (by FAM); Report (in English); Report (in Dhivehi)		Referee: Mohamed Fareed

28 April 2012 6	New Radiant Sports Club	3–0	Club All Youth Linkage	Rasmee Dhandu Stadium, Malé
16:00	Ahmed Abdulla 34'; Ashfaq 43'; Fazeel 50' (pen.); Niyaz (yellow card) 74'; Kingsley (yellow card) 85'	Report (by FAM); Report (in English); Report (in Dhivehi)	(yellow card) 49' Siyad; (yellow card) 69' (penalty missed) 85' Lareef; (yellow card) 81' Usamath	Referee: Ali Saleem

29 April 2012 7	Vyansa	0–0	VB Addu FC	Rasmee Dhandu Stadium, Malé
16:00		Report (by FAM); Report (in English); Report (in Dhivehi)	(yellow card) 35' Ashad; (red card) 38' Sobah; (yellow card) 78' Cengiz; (yellow card) 78' Ashfan	Referee: Ahmed Aslam

30 April 2012 8	Victory Sports Club	1–1	Club Eagles	Rasmee Dhandu Stadium, Malé
16:00	Shifan 90+2'	Report (by FAM); Report (in English); Report (in Dhivehi)	(yellow card) 40' (yellow-red card) 60' Mukhthar; (yellow card) 79' (yellow-red card) 90' H. Athif; 80' Imaaz	Referee: Ahmed Afsah

3 May 2012 9	VB Addu FC	1–1	Club All Youth Linkage	Rasmee Dhandu Stadium, Malé
16:00	Ashad 47'; Mohamed H. (yellow card) 58'; Ashfan (yellow card) 60'; Fairooz (yellow card) 68'; Faruhadh (yellow card) 86'	Report (by FAM); Report (in English); Report (in Dhivehi)	(yellow card) 19' Usamath; (yellow card) 38' Nimal; 70' (pen.) Moosa	Referee: Ali Saleem

4 May 2012 10	Victory Sports Club	3–0	Vyansa	Rasmee Dhandu Stadium, Malé
16:00	Shimaz 4'; Adhuham 62'; Umair 72'	Report (by FAM); Report (in English); Report (in Dhivehi)	(yellow card) 47' Waheed; (yellow card) 90+2' Muhaimin	Referee: Mohamed Fareed

5 May 2012 11	Club Valencia	0–3	New Radiant Sports Club	Rasmee Dhandu Stadium, Malé
16:00	Ifrah (yellow card) 25'; Fatih M.N. (yellow card) 77'; A. Imran (yellow card) 83'	Report (by FAM); Report (in English); Report (in Dhivehi)	8' (yellow card) 83' Ashfaq; (penalty missed) 26' 89' Ibrahim Fazeel; 49' Ahmed Abdulla	Referee: Ahmed Aslam

6 May 2012 12	Maziya Sports & Recreation Club	2–1	Club Eagles	Rasmee Dhandu Stadium, Malé
16:00	Ahmed 25', 41'; A. Niyaz (red card) 67'; Ahmed M. (yellow card) 71'	Report (by FAM); Report (in English); Report (in Dhivehi)	(yellow card) 38' Arif; 68' (pen.) Assad; (yellow card) 76' Musthafa	Referee: Ahmed Shifan

11 May 2012 13	New Radiant Sports Club	1–1	Club Eagles	Rasmee Dhandu Stadium, Malé
16:00	Mohamed Farrah (yellow card) 31' (yellow-red card) 48'; Fazeel 90+3'	Report (by FAM); Report (in English); Report (in Dhivehi)	50' (pen.) Assad; (yellow card) 53' Haneef; (yellow card) 81' Imaaz; (yellow card) 90+6' Musthafa	Referee: Ahmed Aslam

12 May 2012 14	Maziya Sports & Recreation Club	1–1	Vyansa	Rasmee Dhandu Stadium, Malé
16:00	Ahmed 26'	Report (by FAM); Report (in English); Report (in Dhivehi)	55' Haidhar; (yellow card) 71' Imran N.	Referee: Ali Saleem

13 May 2012 15	Victory Sports Club	4–0	Club All Youth Linkage	Rasmee Dhandu Stadium, Malé
16:00	Umair 37'; I. Shinaz 45'; Shifan (yellow card) 48'; Shimaz 63'; Adhuham 66'	Report (by FAM); Report (in English); Report (in Dhivehi)	(yellow card) 53' Moosa; (yellow card) 75' Amir	Referee: Mohamed Fareed

14 May 2012 16	VB Addu FC	2–2	Club Valencia	Rasmee Dhandu Stadium, Malé
16:00	Abu 45+1', 90+5'; Saeed (yellow card) 80'; Faruhadh (yellow card) 81'	Report (by FAM); Report (in English); Report (in Dhivehi)	33', 90+2' Salomon; (yellow card) 77' Osei	Referee: Ahmed Afsah

17 May 2012 17	Maziya Sports & Recreation Club	1–2	Club All Youth Linkage	Rasmee Dhandu Stadium, Malé
16:00	Hussain N. (yellow card) 13'; Ahmed 48' (pen.)	Report (by FAM); Report (in English); Report (in Dhivehi)	45+5' (yellow card) 85' Muaz; (yellow card) 62' Usamath; 69' Shauya	Referee: Ahmed Aslam

18 May 2012 18	VB Addu FC	6–3	Club Eagles	Rasmee Dhandu Stadium, Malé
16:00	Nashid 6'; Abu 16', 36', 53', 69'; Charles (yellow card) 88'; Solah 90+2'	Report (by FAM); Report (in English); Report (in Dhivehi)	32', 77' Imaaz; Mukhthar (yellow card) 41'; Arif 50'	Referee: Ali Saleem

19 May 2012 19	Victory Sports Club	5–1	Club Valencia	Rasmee Dhandu Stadium, Malé
16:00	Umair 36', 66', 73', 88'; Shafiu 71'	Report (by FAM); Report (in English); Report (in Dhivehi)	12' (yellow card) 87' Salomon; A. Imran (yellow card) 70'; Asif (yellow card) 85'	Referee: Mohamed Anil

20 May 2012 20	New Radiant Sports Club	0–0	Vyansa	Rasmee Dhandu Stadium, Malé
16:00		Report (by FAM); Report (in English); Report (in Dhivehi)	(yellow card) 10' H. Fairooz; (yellow card) 45+?' Githurees	Referee: Mohamed Fareed

23 May 2012 21	Club Eagles	2–1	Club All Youth Linkage	Rasmee Dhandu Stadium, Malé
16:00	Imaaz 63'; H. Athif 74'	Report (by FAM); Report (in English); Report (in Dhivehi)	19' (yellow card) 45' Shauya	Referee: Ibrahim Thaufeeq

24 May 2012 22	Club Valencia	2–0	Vyansa	Rasmee Dhandu Stadium, Malé
16:00	Wisham (yellow card) 53' (yellow-red card) 58'; Osei 55', 71'	Report (by FAM); Report (in English); Report (in Dhivehi)	(yellow card) 59' Shiyah; (yellow card) 68' Mazhar	Referee: Ahmed Afsah

25 May 2012 23	Victory Sports Club	1–5	New Radiant Sports Club	Rasmee Dhandu Stadium, Malé
16:00	Shifan (yellow card) 12'; Akram (yellow card) 49' (yellow-red card) 70'; Adhuham (yellow card) 74' (red card) 77'; Awilo 74'; I. Shinaz (yellow card) 77'; Lavent (yellow card) 90+2'	Report (by FAM); Report (in English); Report (in Dhivehi)	(yellow card) 19' Umar; 21', 31' Thoriq; (yellow card) 34' Ahmed Abdulla; (yellow card) 50' (goal) 71' (pen.) Fazeel; (yellow card) 63' Kudas; (red card) 77' Imran; 90+2' (pen.), 90+7 Ashfaq	Referee: Ali Saleem

26 May 2012 24	VB Addu FC	1–2	Maziya Sports & Recreation Club	Rasmee Dhandu Stadium, Malé
16:00	Ashfan (yellow card) 25'; Nafiu 50'; Faruhadh (yellow card) 64'; Abu (red card) 90+1'	Report (by FAM); Report (in English); Report (in Dhivehi)	11' Assadhulla; (yellow card) 19' Nishan; 65' (pen.) Ahmed	Referee: Mohamed Fareed

29 May 2012 25	Club Eagles	1–0	Club Valencia	Rasmee Dhandu Stadium, Malé
16:00	Assad 2'; Yamaan (yellow card) 74'; Hassan (yellow card) 87'	Report (by FAM); Report (in English); Report (in Dhivehi)	(yellow card) 32' (yellow-red card) 55' Mahir; (yellow card) 57' A. Imran	Referee: Ahmed Aslam

30 May 2012 26	Club All Youth Linkage	0–5	Vyansa	Rasmee Dhandu Stadium, Malé
16:00	Amir (yellow card) 42'; Lareef (yellow card) 83'	Report (by FAM); Report (in English); Report (in Dhivehi)	14' Muhaimin; 31' Rizuwan; 45' Usam; 62' Sujau; 85' Shiyah	Referee: Ahmed Afsah

31 May 2012 27	Maziya Sports & Recreation Club	0–1	New Radiant Sports Club	Rasmee Dhandu Stadium, Malé
16:00	Shafraz (yellow card) 45+1'; Shiyam (yellow card) 48'; Ahmed (yellow card) 80'	Report (by FAM); Report (in English); Report (in Dhivehi)	(yellow card) 65' (goal) 75' Umar	Referee: Mohamed Fareed

1 June 2012 28	VB Addu FC	1–2	Victory Sports Club	Rasmee Dhandu Stadium, Malé
16:00	Shamweel 5' (pen.); Sobah (red card) 8'; Ashad (yellow card) 72'; Fairooz (yellow card) 74'	Report (by FAM); Report (in English); Report (in Dhivehi)	24' Umair; 33' Kaka; (yellow card) 56' Awilo; (yellow card) 70' Ali	Referee: Ali Saleem

== Round 1 statistics ==
=== Scorers ===
Rank	Player	Club	Goals
1	(Maldives) Ali Ashfaq	New Radiant SC	7
1	(Maldives) Ahmed Rasheed	Maziya S&RC	7
1	(Maldives) Mohamed Umair	Victory SC	7
2	(Sierra Leone) Abu Desmond Mansaray	VB Addu FC	6
3	(Benin) Salomon Wisdom	Club Valencia	4
3	(Maldives) Ahmed Imaaz	Club Eagles	4
3	(Maldives) Ibrahim Fazeel	New Radiant SC	4
3	(Maldives) Assadhulla Abdulla	Maziya S&RC	4
4	(Maldives) Ahmed Thoriq	New Radiant SC	3
4	(Maldives) Assad Abdul Ghanee	Club Eagles	3
5	(Maldives) Ahmed Abdulla	New Radiant SC	2
5	(Maldives) Hussain Shimaz	Victory SC	2
5	(Maldives) Hassan Adhuham	Victory SC	2
5	(Maldives) Mohamed Shauya	Club All Youth Linkage	2
5	(Ghana) Quincy Osei	Club Valencia	2
5	(Cameroon) Hansley Awilo	Victory SC	2
6	(Maldives) Akram Abdul Ghanee	Victory SC	1
6	(Maldives) Mohamed Shaffaz	Victory SC	1
6	(Maldives) Shinaz Hilmy	Club Eagles	1
6	(Maldives) Mohamed Shifan	Victory SC	1
6	(Maldives) Ashad Ali	VB Addu FC	1
6	(Maldives) Moosa Hassan	Club All Youth Linkage	1
6	(Maldives) Haidhar Akram	Vyansa	1
6	(Maldives) Ibrahim Shinaz	Victory SC	1
6	(Maldives) Abdulla Muaz	Club All Youth Linkage	1
6	(Maldives) Ahmed Nashid	VB Addu FC	1
6	(Maldives) Mohamed Arif	Club Eagles	1
6	(Maldives) Hassan Solah	VB Addu FC	1
6	(Maldives) Shafiu Ahmed	Victory SC	1
6	(Maldives) Hussain Athif	Club Eagles	1
6	(Maldives) Ali Nafiu	VB Addu FC	1
6	(Maldives) Abdul Muhaimin Mohamed	Vyansa	1
6	(Maldives) Ibrahim Rizuwan	Vyansa	1
6	(Maldives) Ahmed Usam	Vyansa	1
6	(Maldives) Hussain Sujau	Vyansa	1
6	(Maldives) Ismail Shiyah	Vyansa	1
6	(Maldives) Ali Umar	New Radiant SC	1
6	(Maldives) Shamweel Qasim	VB Addu FC	1
6	(Nigeria) Chinda Chizi Kaka	Victory SC	1

=== Assists ===
Rank	Player	Club	Assists
1	(Maldives) Rilwan Waheed	Victory SC	2
1	(Nigeria) Kingsley Chukwudi Nkurumeh	New Radiant SC	2
1	(Maldives) Ibrahim Furugan	Maziya S&RC	2
1	(Maldives) Assadhulla Abdulla	Maziya S&RC	2
1	(Maldives) Mohamed Umair	Victory SC	2
1	(Ghana) Quincy Osei	Club Valencia	2
1	(Cameroon) Hansley Awilo	Victory SC	2
1	(Maldives) Hassan Adhuham	Victory SC	2
1	(Maldives) Ahmed Ashraf Yoosuf	Club All Youth Linkage	2
1	(Maldives) Mukhthar Naseer	Club Eagles	2
1	(Maldives) Abdulla Midhuhath Fahumy	New Radiant SC	2
2	(Maldives) Shameem Abdul Gadir	New Radiant SC	1
2	(Maldives) Ahmed Niyaz	New Radiant SC	1
2	(Maldives) Ismail Easa	Maziya S&RC	1
2	(Maldives) Ibrahim Shiyam	Maziya S&RC	1
2	(Maldives) Ahmed Rasheed	Maziya S&RC	1
2	(Maldives) Ibrahim Fazeel	New Radiant SC	1
2	(Liberia) Wright Charles Gaye	VB Addu FC	1
2	(Maldives) Hussain Shifaz	Maziya S&RC	1
2	(Maldives) Ali Umar	New Radiant SC	1
2	(Maldives) Imran Nasheed	Vyansa	1
2	(Maldives) Mohamed Shifan	Victory SC	1
2	(Maldives) Ahmed Sinan Mohamed	Club Valencia	1
2	(Maldives) Ahmed Imaaz	Club Eagles	1
2	(Maldives) Mohamed Arif	Club Eagles	1
2	(Maldives) Ibrahim Hamdhaan	Club Valencia	1
2	(Maldives) Ali Ashfaq	New Radiant SC	1
2	(Nigeria) Chinda Chizi Kaka	Victory SC	1
2	(Maldives) Adam Shareef	New Radiant SC	1
2	(Netherlands) Hüseyin Cengiz	VB Addu FC	1
2	(Maldives) Ahmed Zaad	Vyansa	1
2	(Maldives) Hussain Sujau	Vyansa	1
2	(Maldives) Ibrahim Rizuwan	Vyansa	1

=== Hat-tricks ===
Player	For	Against	Result	Date
(Maldives) Ali Ashfaq	New Radiant SC	VB Addu FC	0–4	18 April 2012
(Sierra Leone) Abu Desmond Mansaray^{4}	VB Addu FC	Club Eagles	6–3	18 May 2012
(Maldives) Mohamed Umair^{4}	Victory SC	Club Valencia	5–1	19 May 2012

- ^{4} Player scored 4 goals

=== Clean sheets ===
- Clean sheets by Club:
  - New Radiant SC (5)
  - Vyansa (3)
  - Victory SC (2)
  - Club Valencia (2)
  - Club Eagles (2)
  - VB Addu FC (1)
  - Club All Youth Linkage (0)
- Clean sheets by goalkeepers:
  - Imran Mohamed (New Radiant SC) (4)
  - Alexander Osei Domfeh (Vyansa) (3)
  - Lavent Vanli (Victory SC) (2)
  - Ibrahim Ifrah Areef (Club Valencia) (2)
  - Mohamed Yamaan (Club Eagles) (2)
  - Abdulla Fayaz (New Radiant SC) (2)
  - Mohamed Imran (Maziya S&RC) (1)
  - Mohamed Shinan (VB Addu FC) (1)
  - Athif Ahmed (Maziya S&RC) (0)
  - Hussain Habeeb (VB Addu FC) (0)
  - Ibrahim Siyad (Club All Youth Linkage) (0)
  - Abdulla Ziyazan (VB Addu FC) (0)
