= 2012 Dhivehi League =

Dhivehi League
- Season: 2012
- Champions: New Radiant
- AFC Cup: New Radiant
- Top goalscorer: (Maldives) Ali Ashfaq (9 goals)
- Longest unbeaten run: 19 games New Radiant

Statistics of Dhivehi League in the 2012 season. According to the FAM Calendar 2012, Dhiraagu Dhivehi League will start on April 18 and is set to end on September 27. The winner will qualify for the AFC Cup and 2nd place will qualify for AFC Cup play-offs.

== Teams ==
- Club All Youth Linkage
- Club Eagles
- Club Valencia
- Club Vyansa
- Maziya S&RC
- New Radiant SC
- VB Addu FC (name rebranded from VB Sports Club)
- Victory Sports Club

=== Personnel ===
Note: Flags indicate national team as has been defined under FIFA eligibility rules. Players may hold more than one non-FIFA nationality.

| Team | Coach | Captain | Shirt sponsor |
|---|---|---|---|
| All Youth Linkage FC | (Maldives) Mohamed Athif | (Maldives) Adam Lareef | Nippon Paint |
| Club Eagles | (Maldives) Ihsan Abdul Ghanee | (Maldives) Assad Abdul Ghanee | — |
| Club Valencia | (Maldives) Mohamed Iqbal | (Maldives) Ali Imran | Philips |
| Club Vyansa | (Maldives) Ahmed Mujuthaba | (Maldives) Abdul Muhaimin | Al Mudhish |
| Maziya S&RC | (Maldives) Ismail Mahfooz | (Maldives) Ali Niyaz | ell mobile |
| New Radiant SC | (Maldives) Mohamed Shiyaz | (Maldives) Ahmed Thoriq | Milo and MediaNet^{1} |
| VB Addu FC | (Turkey) Bahtiyar Can Vanlı | (Maldives) Ashad Ali | Coca-Cola |
| Victory Sports Club | (Maldives) Ali Suzain | (Maldives) Shafiu Ahmed | Hitachi(STO) and Happy Market^{2} |

- ^{1} MediaNet on the front right side of the jersey, just opposite to the club logo.
- ^{2} Happy Market sponsor at the back, just below the jersey number. Happy Market sponsored their imported product "Oldenburger Milk".

== League table ==
Format: In Round 1 and Round 2, all eight teams play against each other. Top six teams after Round 2 play against each other in Round 3. Teams with most total points after Round 3 are crowned the Dhivehi League champions and qualified for the AFC Cup. The top four teams qualify for the President's Cup. Bottom two teams after Round 2 play against top two teams of Second Division in Dhivehi League Qualification for places in next year's Dhivehi League.

=== Final standings ===
| Pos | Team | Pld | W | D | L | GF | GA | GD | Pts | Qualification |
|---|---|---|---|---|---|---|---|---|---|---|
| 1 | New Radiant SC | 19 | 15 | 4 | 0 | 48 | 9 | +39 | 49 | 2013 AFC Cup group stage President's Cup (Note: Maziya S&RC qualified for the 2013 AFC Cup as they won the 2012 Maldives FA Cup.) |
| 2 | Victory Sports Club | 19 | 11 | 4 | 4 | 50 | 26 | +24 | 37 | President's Cup |
| 3 | Maziya S&RC | 19 | 11 | 2 | 6 | 42 | 24 | +18 | 35 | 2013 AFC Cup group stage President's Cup |
| 4 | VB Addu FC | 19 | 7 | 4 | 8 | 47 | 45 | +2 | 25 | President's Cup |
| 5 | Club Eagles | 19 | 5 | 6 | 8 | 26 | 39 | −13 | 21 | |
| 6 | Club All Youth Linkage | 19 | 4 | 3 | 12 | 18 | 48 | −30 | 15 | |
| 7 | Vyansa (R) | 14 | 2 | 3 | 9 | 10 | 25 | −15 | 9 | Promotion/relegation playoff |
| 8 | Club Valencia | 14 | 2 | 2 | 10 | 17 | 42 | −25 | 8 | Promotion/relegation playoff |

Rules for classification: 1) points; 2) goal difference; 3) number of goals scored.
(R) Relegated

== Results ==
=== Round 1 results ===
A total of 28 matches will be played in this round.

=== Round 2 results ===
A total of 28 matches will be played in this round.

=== Round 3 results ===
A total of 15 matches will be played in this round.

== Season statistics ==
=== Scorers ===
| Rank | Player | Club | Goals |
|---|---|---|---|
| 1 | (Maldives) Ali Ashfaq | New Radiant SC | 9 |
| 1 | (Maldives) Ahmed Rasheed | Maziya S&RC | 9 |
| 1 | (Maldives) Mohamed Umair | Victory Sports Club | 9 |
| 2 | (Sierra Leone) Abu Desmond Mansaray | VB Addu FC | 6 |
| 3 | (Benin) Salomon Wisdom | Club Valencia | 4 |
| 3 | (Maldives) Ahmed Imaz | Club Eagles | 4 |
| 3 | (Maldives) Ibrahim Fazeel | New Radiant SC | 4 |
| 3 | (Maldives) Assadhulla Abdulla | Maziya S&RC | 4 |
| 4 | (Maldives) Ahmed Thoriq | New Radiant SC | 5 |
| 4 | (Maldives) Assad Abdul Ghanee | Club Eagles | 5 |
| 5 | (Maldives) Ibrahim Hamdhaan | Club Valencia | 4 |

=== Assists ===
| Rank | Player | Club | Assists |
|---|---|---|---|
| 1 | (Maldives) Ibrahim Hamdhaan | Club Valencia | 4 |
| 2 | (Maldives) Rilwan Waheed | Victory SC | 2 |
| 2 | (Nigeria) Kingsley Chukwudi Nkurumeh | New Radiant SC | 2 |
| 2 | (Maldives) Ibrahim Furugan | Maziya S&RC | 2 |
| 2 | (Maldives) Assadhulla Abdulla | Maziya S&RC | 2 |
| 2 | (Maldives) Mohamed Umair | Victory Sports Club | 2 |
| 2 | (Ghana) Quincy Osei | Club Valencia | 2 |
| 2 | (Cameroon) Hansley Awilo | Victory Sports Club | 2 |
| 2 | (Maldives) Hassan Adhuham | Victory Sports Club | 2 |
| 2 | (Maldives) Ahmed Ashraf Yoosuf | Club All Youth Linkage | 2 |
| 2 | (Maldives) Mukhthar Naseer | Club Eagles | 2 |
| 2 | (Maldives) Abdulla Midhuhath Fahumy | New Radiant SC | 2 |

=== Hat-tricks ===
| Player | For | Against | Result | Date |
|---|---|---|---|---|
| (Maldives) Ali Ashfaq | New Radiant SC | VB Addu FC | 0–4 | 18 April 2012 |
| (Sierra Leone) Abu Desmond Mansaray^{4} | VB Addu FC | Club Eagles | 6–3 | 18 May 2012 |
| (Maldives) Mohamed Umair^{4} | Victory Sports Club | Club Valencia | 5–1 | 19 May 2012 |

- ^{4} Player scored 4 goals

=== Scoring ===
- First goal of the season: Ashfaq for New Radiant SC against VB Addu FC (18 April 2012)
- Fastest goal of the season: 3 minutes 8 seconds – Shamweel for VB Addu FC against Victory Sports Club (1 June 2012)
- Largest winning margin: 5 goals
  - Club All Youth Linkage 0–5 Vyansa (30 May 2012)
- Highest scoring game: 9 goals
  - VB Addu FC 6–3 Club Eagles (18 May 2012)
- Most goals scored in a match by a single team: 6 goals
  - VB Addu FC 6–3 Club Eagles (18 May 2012)
- Most goals scored in a match by a losing team: 3 goals
  - VB Addu FC 6–3 Club Eagles (18 May 2012)

=== Clean sheets by club ===
- Most clean sheets: 5
  - New Radiant SC
- Fewest clean sheets: 0
  - Club All Youth Linkage

=== Clean sheets by goalkeepers ===
- Most clean sheets: 4
  - Imran Mohamed (New Radiant SC)
- Fewest clean sheets: 0
  - Hussain Habeeb (VB Addu FC)
  - Ibrahim Siyad (Club All Youth Linkage)
  - Abdulla Ziyazan (VB Addu FC)
  - Athif Ahmed (Maziya S&RC)

=== Discipline ===
- Worst overall disciplinary record (1 pt per yellow card, 2 pts per red card):
  - VB Addu FC – 23 points (17 yellow & 3 red card)
- Best overall disciplinary record:
  - Maziya S&RC – 9 points (7 yellow & 1 red card)
  - Vyansa – 9 points (9 yellow cards)
- Most yellow cards (club): 17 – VB Addu FC
- Most yellow cards (player):
  - 4 – Ali Imran (Club Valencia)
- Most red cards (club): 3 – VB Addu FC
- Most red cards/suspensions (player):
  - 2 – Sobah Mohamed (VB Addu FC)

== Promotion/relegation playoff for 2013 Dhivehi League ==
| Pos | Team | Pld | W | D | L | GF | GA | GD | Pts | Promotion or relegation |
|---|---|---|---|---|---|---|---|---|---|---|
| 1 | Valencia | 3 | 3 | 0 | 0 | 7 | 2 | +5 | 9 | Promoted |
| 2 | BG Sports Club | 3 | 2 | 0 | 1 | 5 | 3 | +2 | 6 | Promoted |
| 3 | Vyansa | 3 | 1 | 0 | 2 | 6 | 8 | −2 | 3 | Relegated |
| 4 | United Victory | 3 | 0 | 0 | 3 | 2 | 7 | −5 | 0 | Relegated |

=== Matches ===
| 17 September 2012 1 | Valencia | 1 – 0 | United Victory | Rasmee Dhandu Stadium, Malé |
| 15:50 | Mohamed Irufaan 84' | Report |

| 18 September 2012 2 | Vyansa | 1 – 2 | BG Sports Club | Rasmee Dhandu Stadium, Malé |
| 15:50 | Ibrahim Rizuwan 56' | Report | 60', 78' Ramlan Branudeen |

| 22 September 2012 3 | Valencia | 2 – 1 | BG Sports Club | Rasmee Dhandu Stadium, Malé |
| 15:50 | Mohamed Irufaan 23', 83' | Report | 1' Fauzan |

| 23 September 2012 4 | Vyansa | 4 – 2 | United Victory | Rasmee Dhandu Stadium, Malé |
| 15:50 | Abdul Muhaimin Mohamed 4', 45'; Imran Nasheed 36'; Ahmed Usam 69' | Report | 28' Ahmed Sujau; 78' Mohamed Riffath |

| 28 September 2012 5 | BG Sports Club | 2 – 0 | United Victory | Rasmee Dhandu Stadium, Malé |
| 15:50 | Channa Ediri Bandanage 17'; Ali Shifau 80' | Report |

| 28 September 2012 6 | Vyansa | 1 – 4 | Valencia | Rasmee Dhandu Stadium, Malé |
| 21:00 | Ahmed Zaad 14' | Report | 24' Mohamed Irufaan; 82' Salomon Wisdom; 87' Ibrahim Hamdhaan; 90' Abdul Wahid Ibrahim |
