= 2003 Maldives FA Cup =

Maldives FA Cup
Tournament details
- Country: Maldives
- Teams: 16

Final positions
- Champions: Island FC
- Runner-up: Club Valencia

Tournament statistics
- Matches played: 16
- Goals scored: 74 (4.63 per match)
- Top goal scorer(s): Ibrahim Fazeel (IFC) (8 goals)

The 2003 Maldives FA Cup, was the 16th edition of the Maldives FA Cup.

== First round ==
11 May 2003

Island FC	7–0	TCMO
Ibrahim Fazeel ?', ?', ?', ?'; Yoosuf Azeem ?'; Ibrahim Shiyam ?'; Adam Abdul Latheef ?'

Gaumee Football Dhan'du, Malé

12 May 2003

New Radiant	7–0	FC Baaz
Ahmed Thariq 11', 64', 89'; Shah Ismail 18'; Hussain Shiyan 45'; Abdul Mannaan 90+2'; Ali Shiham ?'

Gaumee Football Dhan'du, Malé

13 May 2003

United Victory	6–1	Hilaalee Sports Club
Faseen ?', ?', ?'; Ibrahim Nizam ?', ?'; Hussein Rasheed ?'		26' Ahmed Waheed

Gaumee Football Dhan'du, Malé

15 May 2003

New Star	2–1	Guraidhoo Z.J.
Ahmed Fazeem ?'; Ahmed Amir 73' (pen.)		10' Hussain Sobah

Gaumee Football Dhan'du, Malé

16 May 2003

Victory Sports Club	3–0	Vyansa
Ismail Anil 37'; Ali Haleem 53', 81'

Gaumee Football Dhan'du, Malé

17 May 2003

SC Mecano	5–0	Ahly Sports
Ahmed Shakir ?', ?'; Azim Hussein ?'; Hussain Shimaz 45', 52'

Gaumee Football Dhan'du, Malé

19 May 2003

Hurriyya SC	2–0	Club Eagles
Ahmed Lareef 37'; Ali Shiyam 84'

Gaumee Football Dhan'du, Malé

20 May 2003

Club Valencia	6–0	BG Sports Club
Assad Abdul Ghanee 26', 42', 59'; Ali Umar 29'; Ismail Mahfooz 69'; Mohamed Nizam 73'

Gaumee Football Dhan'du, Malé

== Quarter-finals ==
23 May 2003

Island FC	11–0	United Victory
Ibrahim Fazeel ?', ?', ?', ?'; Ibrahim Shiyam ?', ?', ?'; Ilyas Ibrahim ?'; Yoosuf Azeem ?'; Ahmed Sunain ?'; Ismail Mohamed ?'

Gaumee Football Dhan'du, Malé

24 May 2003

New Radiant	6–1	New Star
Ahmed Thariq 20'; Ali Shiham 30', 74', 89'; Hussain Shiyan ?'; Adam Fazeeh 66'		24' Ahmed Shaaiq

Gaumee Football Dhan'du, Malé

25 May 2003

Victory Sports Club	2–0	Hurriyya SC
Ahmed Ashfan 17'; Niroshan Abeysekara 90+1'

Gaumee Football Dhan'du, Malé

26 May 2003

Club Valencia	5–1	SC Mecano
Assad Abdul Ghanee 16'; Ali Ashfaq 45', 60', 72' (pen.), 77'

Gaumee Football Dhan'du, Malé

== Semi-finals ==
29 May 2003

Island FC	1–0	Victory Sports Club
Ahmed Sunain 50'

Gaumee Football Dhan'du, Malé

30 May 2003

Club Valencia	2–1	New Radiant
Assad Abdul Ghanee 20'; Mohamed Nizam 76'		55' Ali Shiham

Gaumee Football Dhan'du, Malé

== Third place play-off ==
4 June 2003

Victory Sports Club	2–1	New Radiant
Mohamed Muhsin 20'; Mohamed Asmeer Latheef 28'		30' Mohamed Hussain

Gaumee Football Dhan'du, Malé

== Final ==
5 June 2003

Island FC	1–0	Club Valencia
Ahmed Sunain 26'

Gaumee Football Dhan'du, Malé
