= 2002 Maldives FA Cup =

Maldives FA Cup
Tournament details
- Country: Maldives
- Teams: 16

Final positions
- Champions: Island FC
- Runners-up: New Radiant

Tournament statistics
- Matches played: 16
- Goals scored: 99 (6.19 per match)
- Top goal scorer(s): Ediri Channa (IFC) (8 goals)

The 2002 Maldives FA Cup was the 15th edition of the Maldives FA Cup.

== First round ==
11 April 2002

Maziya (2)	1–1	New Star (2)
Ismail Mohamed 47'		68' Ahmed Shakeeb
Penalties
	4–3

Gaumee Football Dhan'du, Malé

13 April 2002

Victory Sports Club (1)	8–0	United Victory (3)
Ibrahim Shiyam 4', 83'; Shah Ismail 32', 49'; Ahmed Amir 40', 50'; Ali Haleem 44'; Ismail Anil 78'

Gaumee Football Dhan'du, Malé

14 April 2002

Island FC (1)	20–0	Lazer (3)
Yousuf Azeem 2'; Channa Ediri Bandanage 3', 7', 15', 21', 23'; Mohamed Sunain 19', 31'; Adam Abdul Latheef 25', 37', 40'; Mohamed Jameel 29', 83'; Isuru Perera 57', 65', 77', 81'; Niroshan Abeysekara 68'; Mohamed Mahzoom 76'; Abdulla Haaroon 90' (o.g.)

Gaumee Football Dhan'du, Malé

15 April 2002

New Radiant (1)	4–0	Ahly Sports (3)
Ismail Hilmy 20' (o.g.); Ibrahim Siyad 45'; Hassan Thaufeeg 67'; Mausoom Abdul Ghafoor 81'

Gaumee Football Dhan'du, Malé

17 April 2002

Club Gaamagu (3)	0–10	Club Eagles (1)
		8', 53', 86' Ahmed Shakir (?) Mohamed Ziyad (?) Mohamed Abdul Azeez (?) Mohamed Rameez (?) Mohamed Manik (?) Ahmed Fayaz

Gaumee Football Dhan'du, Malé

18 April 2002

STELCO (2)	2–0	Club Baico (3)
Ibrahim Khaleel 46'; Ahmed Nasheed 60' (o.g.)

Gaumee Football Dhan'du, Malé

20 April 2002

SC Mecano (2)	2–8	Club Valencia (1)
Mohamed Shaffaz (?); Amjad Ali 76' (pen.)		11', 26', 77' Ahmed Naseem; 48' (o.g.) Hussain Rasheed; 49' Ali Rasheed; 52' Chachura Maduranga; 52' Assad Abdul Ghanee; 80' Ali Shiham

Gaumee Football Dhan'du, Malé

21 April 2002

Florentina (3)	0–7	Hurriyya SC (1)
		3' Ali Hashim; 9', 76', 78' Ibrahim Fayaz; 29' Hassan Nadeem; 52', 72' Ibrahim Saqib

Gaumee Football Dhan'du, Malé

== Quarter-finals ==
22 April 2002

Island FC (1)	7–0	Club Eagles (1)
Yoosuf Azeem 6'; Ahmed Fayaz 9' (o.g.); Channa Ediri Bandanage 16', 28' (pen.), 41'; Ibrahim Fazeel 51', 81'

Gaumee Football Dhan'du, Malé

24 April 2002

New Radiant (1)	3–0	STELCO (2)
Ashraf Luthfy 60'; Canija 76'; Adam Fazeeh 82'

Gaumee Football Dhan'du, Malé

25 April 2002

Maziya (2)	0–6	Club Valencia (1)
		16', 43', 69' Mohamed Nizam; 32' Chachura Maduranga; 85' Hamzath Ahmed; 90' Mohamed Nazim

Gaumee Football Dhan'du, Malé

26 April 2002

Victory Sports Club (1)	2–3	Hurriyya SC (1)
Ahmed Amir 33'; Shah Ismail 90+2' (pen.)		8' Ibrahim Fayaz; 21' George Dlamini; 24' (pen.) Hassan Nadeem

Gaumee Football Dhan'du, Malé

== Semi-finals ==
29 April 2002

Island FC (1)	1–1	Club Valencia (1)
Mohamed Jameel 8'		38' Ali Shiham
Penalties
	4–3

Gaumee Football Dhan'du, Malé

30 April 2002

New Radiant (1)	7–2	Hurriyya SC (1)
Hassan Thaufeeg 19'; Mausoom Abdul Ghafoor 51'; Hassan Nadeem 67' (o.g.); Adam Fazeeh 53', 90'; Ibrahim Siyad 76', 85'		31', 90+2' Ali Hashim

Gaumee Football Dhan'du, Malé

== Third place play-off ==
2 May 2002

Club Valencia (1)	2–0	Hurriyya SC (1)
Ali Shiham 29', 31'

Gaumee Football Dhan'du, Malé

== Final ==
5 May 2002

Island FC (1)	2–0	New Radiant (1)
Hamdhan Jaufar 32'; Fareed Mohamed 89'

Gaumee Football Dhan'du, Malé
Attendance: 9,000
