= 2007 Maldives FA Cup =

Maldives FA Cup
Tournament details
- Country: Maldives

Final positions
- Champions: New Radiant
- Runner-up: Club Valencia

The 2007 Maldives FA Cup, was the 20th edition of the Maldives FA Cup.

== Preliminary rounds ==
S.C. Veloxia, Red Line Club, Huraa, 8 Degree, Mifaharu, VB Sports Club, B.G. Sports Club, Hithadhoo Youth Wing, Club Teenage, Club Eagles, Vyansa and Hurriyya SC played in the preliminary rounds.

== Quarter-finals ==
3 April 2007

New Radiant	2–1	Vyansa

Gaumee Football Dhan'du, Malé

4 April 2007

Victory Sports Club	7–1	Guraidhoo Z.J.

Gaumee Football Dhan'du, Malé

5 April 2007

Maziya	0–7	VB Sports Club

Gaumee Football Dhan'du, Malé

15 April 2007

Club Valencia	2–1	Club Eagles

Gaumee Football Dhan'du, Malé

== Semi-finals ==
18 April 2007

New Radiant	1–0	Victory Sports Club
Arfiu Mohamed Hameed 71'

Gaumee Football Dhan'du, Malé

20 April 2007

VB Sports Club	1–2	Club Valencia
Ismail Mohamed 70'		26' Azim Hussain; 33' Mukhthar Naseer

Gaumee Football Dhan'du, Malé

== Third place play-off ==
29 April 2007

Victory Sports Club	2–0	VB Sports Club
Ibrahim Shiyam 45+', 53'

Gaumee Football Dhan'du, Malé

== Final ==
30 April 2007

New Radiant	2–0	Club Valencia
Idris Kasirye 61'; Ali Ashfaq 81'

Gaumee Football Dhan'du, Malé
