= 2006 Maldives FA Cup =

Maldives FA Cup
Tournament details
- Country: Maldives

Final positions
- Champions: New Radiant
- Runner-up: Club Valencia

The 2006 Maldives FA Cup, was the 19th edition of the Maldives FA Cup.

== Qualifying rounds ==
=== First round ===
17 February 2006

| Hithadhoo Youth Wing | 1–0 | FC Cicada |

Henveiru Football Ground, Malé

19 February 2006

| FC Baaz | 0–5 | Maziya |

Henveiru Football Ground, Malé

25 February 2006
Teenage won

| Club Teenage | Unknown | TCMO |

Henveiru Football Ground, Malé

6 March 2006
BG Sports won

| United Victory | Unknown | B.G. Sports Club |

Henveiru Football Ground, Malé

6 March 2006
New Star won

| New Star | Unknown | Galolhu SC |

Henveiru Football Ground, Malé

=== Second round ===
9 March 2006
Maziya won

| Hithadhoo Youth Wing | Unknown | Maziya |

Henveiru Football Ground, Malé

10 March 2006
Vyansa won

| New Star | Unknown | Vyansa |

Henveiru Football Ground, Malé

11 March 2006
Teenage won

| Club Teenage | Unknown | ADD |

Henveiru Football Ground, Malé

12 March 2006
Guraidhoo won

| Guraidhoo Z.J. | Unknown | B.G. Sports Club |

Henveiru Football Ground, Malé

=== Third Round ===
16 March 2006
Maziya won

| Maziya | Unknown | Club Teenage |

Henveiru Football Ground, Malé

17 March 2006
Guraidhoo won

| Guraidhoo Z.J. | Unknown | Vyansa |

Henveiru Football Ground, Malé

== Quarter-finals ==
24 March 2006

| Club Valencia | 2–1 | Maziya |

Gaumee Football Dhan'du, Malé

25 March 2006

| Club Eagles | 2–1 | Island FC |

Gaumee Football Dhan'du, Malé

26 March 2006

| Victory Sports Club | 2–1 | Hurriyya SC |

Gaumee Football Dhan'du, Malé

27 March 2006

| New Radiant | 2–1 | Guraidhoo Z.J. |

Gaumee Football Dhan'du, Malé

== Semi-finals ==
2 April 2006

| Club Valencia | 3–1 | Club Eagles |

Gaumee Football Dhan'du, Malé

3 April 2006

| Victory Sports Club | 1–3 | New Radiant |

Gaumee Football Dhan'du, Malé

== Third place play-off ==
6 April 2006

| Club Eagles | 0–3 | Victory Sports Club |

Gaumee Football Dhan'du, Malé

== Final ==
16 April 2006

| Club Valencia | 0–2 | New Radiant |
|---|---|---|
| | | 63' Nita; 85' Ali Umar |

Gaumee Football Dhan'du, Malé
