= 2005 Maldives FA Cup =

Maldives FA Cup
Tournament details
- Country: Maldives

Final positions
- Champions: New Radiant
- Runner-up: Club Valencia

The 2005 Maldives FA Cup, was the 18th edition of the Maldives FA Cup.

== Qualifying rounds ==
=== First round ===
3 April 2005
Maziya won

FC Cicada	Unknown	Maziya

Henveiru Football Ground, Malé

5 April 2005
Eagles won

Muiveyo Friends	Unknown	Club Eagles

Henveiru Football Ground, Malé

12 April 2005
Vyansa won

Kissaru	Unknown	Vyansa

Henveiru Football Ground, Malé

=== Second round ===
22 April 2005
Teenage won

Club Teenage	Unknown	United Victory

Henveiru Football Ground, Malé

23 April 2005
Maziya won

B.G. Sports Club	Unknown	Maziya

Henveiru Football Ground, Malé

24 April 2005
Eagles won

SC Mecano	Unknown	Club Eagles

Henveiru Football Ground, Malé

25 April 2005
Vyansa won

New Star	Unknown	Vyansa

Henveiru Football Ground, Malé

=== Third Round ===
27 April 2005
Maziya won

Club Teenage	Unknown	Maziya

Henveiru Football Ground, Malé

28 April 2005
Vyansa won

Club Eagles	Unknown	Vyansa

Henveiru Football Ground, Malé

== Quarter-finals ==
2 May 2005

Club Valencia	9–0	Maziya

Gaumee Football Dhan'du, Malé

3 May 2005

Guraidhoo Z.J.	0–3	Island FC

Gaumee Football Dhan'du, Malé

4 May 2005

New Radiant	2–1	Hurriyya SC

Gaumee Football Dhan'du, Malé

5 May 2005

Victory Sports Club	2–1	Vyansa

Gaumee Football Dhan'du, Malé

== Semi-finals ==
15 May 2005

Club Valencia	5–2 (a.e.t.)	Island FC

Gaumee Football Dhan'du, Malé

16 May 2005

New Radiant	0–0 (a.e.t.)	Victory Sports Club
Penalties
	3–0

Gaumee Football Dhan'du, Malé

== Third place play-off ==
19 May 2005

Island FC	2–4	Victory Sports Club

Gaumee Football Dhan'du, Malé

== Final ==
20 May 2005

Club Valencia	0–2	New Radiant
		12' Ahmed Mohamed; 75' Mohamed Nimal

Gaumee Football Dhan'du, Malé
