= 2008 Maldives FA Cup =

Maldives FA Cup
Tournament details
- Country: Maldives

Final positions
- Champions: VB Sports Club
- Runner-up: New Radiant S.C.

Tournament statistics
- Matches played: 21
- Goals scored: 101 (4.81 per match)

The 2008 Maldives FA Cup, was the 21st edition of the Maldives FA Cup.

== Qualifying rounds ==
=== First round ===
10 February 2008

Medianet Recreation	5–7	FC Baaz

Henveiru Football Ground, Malé

11 February 2008

Club All Youth Linkage	3–1	T.C. Sports Club
Ahmed Habeeb 55'; Hassan Shiyaan 90'; Abdulla Aseed 90+'	Report (in Dhivehi)	?' Ibrahim Furugan

Henveiru Football Ground, Malé

12 February 2008

Club Eagles	3–2	Club Campo
Adam Naeem ?' (?); Ali Atheek 81'	Report (in Dhivehi)	27' Abdul Baasith; 49' Hussain Ali

Henveiru Football Ground, Malé

13 February 2008

B.G. Sports Club	17–1	New Lazer

Henveiru Football Ground, Malé

17 February 2008

United Victory	3–0	KIN

Henveiru Football Ground, Malé

18 February 2008

Kissaru	0–10	Sosun Club

Henveiru Football Ground, Malé

20 February 2008

FC Cicada	5–1	Male' Football Club

Henveiru Football Ground, Malé

=== Second round ===
21 February 2008

FC Baaz	1–0	Eight Degree

Henveiru Football Ground, Malé

25 February 2008

Club All Youth Linkage	0–1	Club Eagles

Henveiru Football Ground, Malé

26 February 2008

B.G. Sports Club	1–4	United Victory

Henveiru Football Ground, Malé

27 February 2008

Sosun Club	3–1	FC Cicada

Henveiru Football Ground, Malé

=== Third Round ===
28 February 2008

Club Eagles	3–3	FC Baaz
Penalties
	0–3

Henveiru Football Ground, Malé

1 March 2008

United Victory	1–2	Sosun Club

Henveiru Football Ground, Malé

== Quarter-finals ==
4 March 2008

Valencia	8–0	FC Baaz

Gaumee Football Dhan'du, Malé

5 March 2008

Vyansa	0–2	VB Sports Club

Gaumee Football Dhan'du, Malé

6 March 2008

Victory Sports Club	2–1	Maziya S&RC

Gaumee Football Dhan'du, Malé

7 March 2008

New Radiant S.C.	2–0 (a.e.t.)	Sosun Club

Gaumee Football Dhan'du, Malé

== Semi-finals ==
23 March 2008

Club Valencia	0–1	VB Sports Club
		41' Adam Lareef

Gaumee Football Dhan'du, Malé

24 March 2008

Victory Sports Club	0–2	New Radiant S.C.
	Report	22' Akram Abdul Ghanee; 45' Daniel Albome

Gaumee Football Dhan'du, Malé

== Third place play-off ==
27 March 2008

Club Valencia	1–3	Victory Sports Club
Shinaz Hilmy 53' (pen.)		11', 45' Hassan Adhuham; 32' Ibrahim Fazeel

Gaumee Football Dhan'du, Malé

== Final ==
27 March 2008

VB Sports Club	1–0	New Radiant S.C.
Adam Lareef 69'

Gaumee Football Dhan'du, Malé
