= Anwar Abdul Ghanee =

Maldivian footballer

Personal information
- Full name: Anwar Abdul Ghanee
- Date of birth: 17 September 1980 (age 46)
- Place of birth: Maldives
- Position: Defender

Senior career*
Years	Team	Apps	(Gls)
–2005	Valencia		
2006	Victory		
2007	New Radiant		
2008	Vyansa		
2009–2010	VB Sports Club		

International career^{‡}
2003–2004	Maldives	17	(0)
- * Club domestic league appearances and goals ‡ National team caps and goals as of 18 December 2004

Anwar Abdul Ghanee (born 17 September 1980) is a former Maldivian footballer.

== Club career ==
Anwar started his career, playing for Club Valencia, alongside his elder brother Assad and Akram. He suffered a serious knee injury, playing for Valencia in the season opening match of 2005 against New Radiant.

In 2006, he transferred to Victory Sports Club then to New Radiant in 2007.

Anwar agreed to sign for Vyansa in the 2008 season, when the club agreed to give free medical treatments to his injured knee. He played a season with Vyansa and moved to VB Sports Club in 2009, where he continued to play until retirement.

== International career ==
Anwar played for the Maldives national football team alongside his elder brother Assad Abdul Ghanee. He was first called up for the senior national team side in 2003, and he has represented Maldives in FIFA World Cup qualification matches.

== Personal life ==
Anwar is the younger brother of the retired former Maldives national football team captain Assad Abdul Ghanee, and elder brother of New Radiant player Akram Abdul Ghanee.
