= Mohamed Nazeeh =

Maldivian footballer & manager (born 1975)

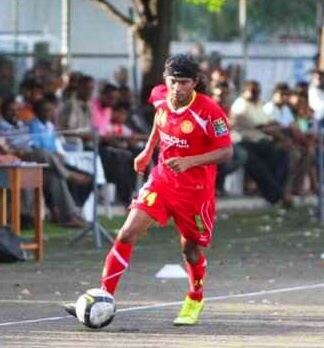

Personal information
- Full name: Mohamed Nazeeh
- Date of birth: 15 June 1975 (age 51)
- Place of birth: Malé, Maldives
- Height: 1.77 m (5 ft 10 in)
- Position: Midfielder

Senior career*
Years	Team	Apps	(Gls)
1996	Club Lagoons		
1997–1998	Victory		
1999–2000	New Radiant		
2001–2006	Victory		

International career
1998–2004	Maldives		(1)

Managerial career
- 2004: United Victory
- 2010: Club Eagles
- 2012: Victory
- 2013: VB Addu FC
- 2015: United Victory
- 2016: Victory
- 2017: United Victory
- * Club domestic league appearances and goals

Mohamed Nazeeh (born 15 June 1975) is a Maldivian football coach, and former player. He is currently coach of United Victory.

== International goals ==
#	Date	Venue	Opponent	Score	Result	Competition
1.	3 December 2003	Galolhu National Stadium, Malé, Maldives	Mongolia	12–0	12–0	2006 FIFA World Cup qualification
