= Mohamed Jameel =

Maldivian footballer

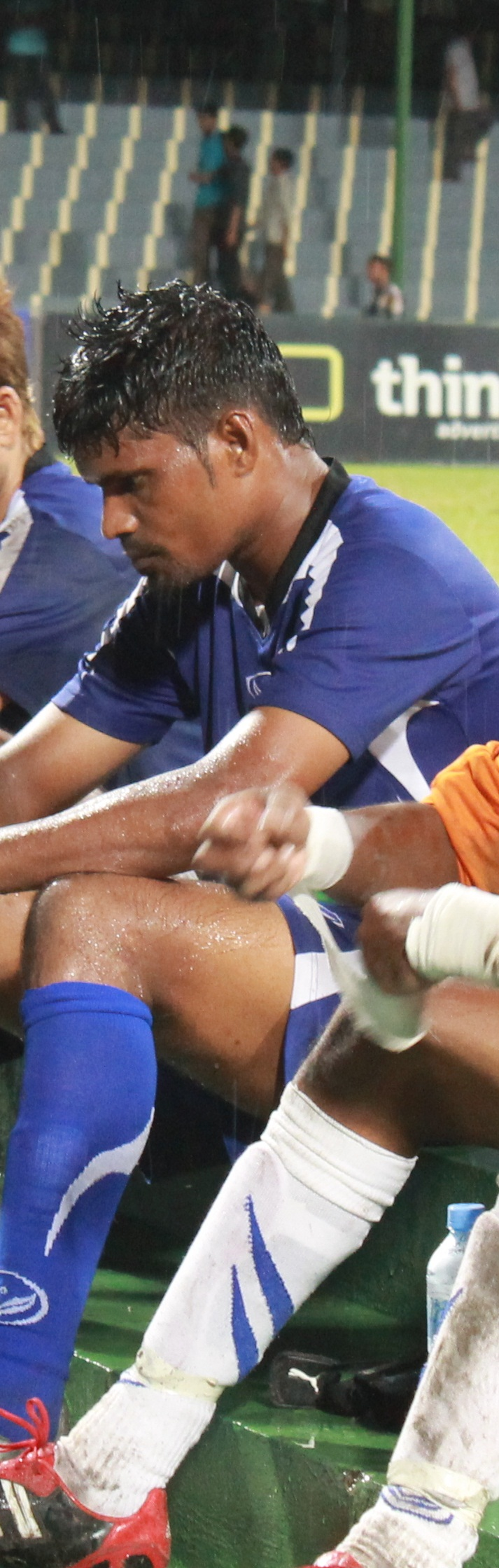
- Jameel after President's Cup Final 2011

Personal information
- Date of birth: 4 October 1975 (age 51)
- Place of birth: Eydhafushi, Maldives
- Height: 1.74 m (5 ft 9 in)
- Position: Defender

Youth career
- Hurriyya SC

Senior career*
Years	Team	Apps	(Gls)
1997–2000	Hurriyya SC	?	(?)
2001–2003	Club Valencia		
2004	Island FC		
2005–2006	New Radiant		
2007–2009	Club Valencia		(2)
2010	Victory	20	(0)
2011	New Radiant	16	(2)
2012–2013	VB Addu FC	19	(0)

International career
2000–2011	Maldives	44	(1)
- * Club domestic league appearances and goals

Mohamed Jameel (born 4 October 1975) is a Maldivian footballer nicknamed "Jambey", who plays as a defender for New Radiant. He was a member of the Maldives national football team. He is from the island of Eydhafushi, Baa Atoll.

== International career ==
Though he started playing for the national team from the year 2000, he became a regular starting player from 2001. His last match was against India in the 2011 SAFF Championship semi-final.

=== International goals ===
#	Date	Venue	Opponent	Score	Result	Competition
1.	12 April 2001	Shaanxi Province Stadium, Xi'an, China	China	7–1	10–1	2002 FIFA World Cup qualification

== Awards and honours ==
=== Club ===
Valencia

- Dhivehi League (4): 2001, 2002, 2003, 2008
- President's Cup (1): 2008
- FA Charity Shield (1): 2009
- POMIS Cup (2): 2001, 2003

New Radiant

- Dhivehi League (1): 2006
- FA Cup (2): 2005, 2006

Victory

- FA Cup (1): 2010

VB Addu FC

- FA Charity Shield (1): 2012

=== International ===
Maldives

- SAFF Championship: 2008; runner-up: 2003, 2009
