= Mohamed Arif =

Maldivian footballer (1985–2024)

- މުހައްމަދު އާރިފް
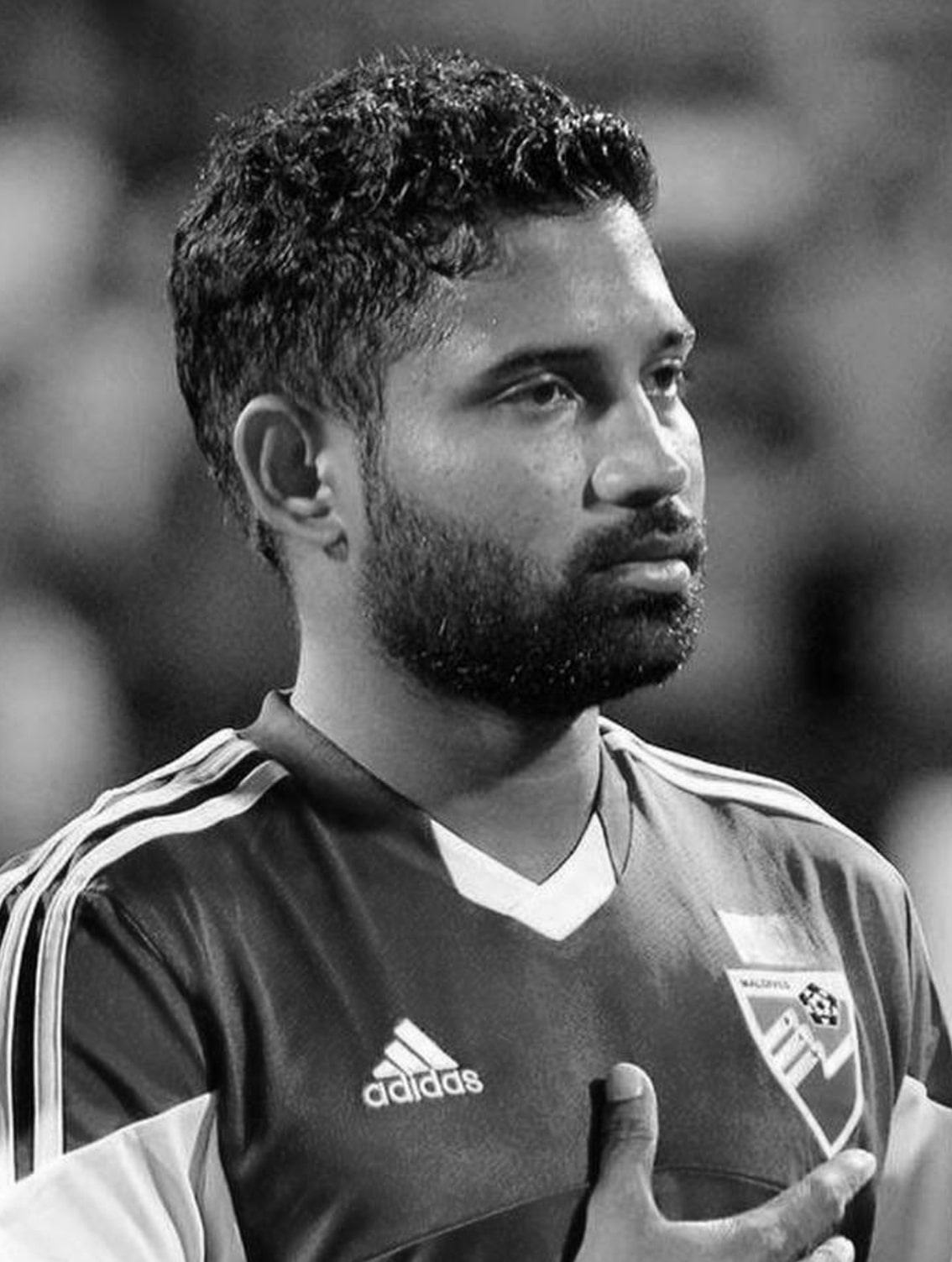
- Born: 11 August 1985; Hithadhoo, Addu City, Maldives
- Died: 25 June 2024 (aged 38); Malé, Maldives
- Resting place: Galolhu Cemetery, Galolhu, Malé, Maldives
- Other name: Baka
- Occupation: Footballer
- Height: 1.78 m (5 ft 10 in)
Association football career
- Position: Midfielder
Youth career
- Addu YDP
Senior career*
Years	Team	Apps	(Gls)
2004–2006	Island FC		
2007	VB Sports Club		
2008	Club Valencia		
2009–2010	New Radiant SC		
2010–2011	Victory		
2011–2012	VB Sports Club		
2012–2013	Club Eagles		
2013–2014	Maziya		
2015	Kanbawza		
2016	Club Valencia		
2017	Victory		
2017	Maziya		
2018–2019	Eagles		
2019–2020	Club Green Streets		
2020–2024	United Victory		
International career
2008–2018	Maldives	58	(1)
- * Club domestic league appearances and goals

Mohamed Arif (Dhivehi: މުހައްމަދު އާރިފް; 11 August 1985 – 25 June 2024), better known by his nickname Baka, was a Maldivian professional footballer who played as a midfielder for Myanmar National league club Kanbawza Football Club and the Maldives national team. Widely regarded as one of the greatest players in the Maldives, he was among the most successful players in the country.

Arif began playing for Island FC at the age of 19 in 2004. During his international career, he was integral to the team's victories in the SAFF Championship, first in 2008 and again in 2018. Arif was awarded the Best Football Player of the Year in 2010. He also secured the title of Second Best Player for 2011 and Third Best Player for 2013. He received the nickname "Baka" from his former coach Mauroof Ahmed, who named him after a foreign midfielder who had previously played for Victory Sports Club.

== Early life ==
Mohamed Arif was born on 11 August 1985 in Hithadhoo in Addu.

== Career ==
Arif's football career was defined by his journey through various clubs and tournaments. He began in 2004 with Island Football Club (IFC), which later rebranded to VB Sports Club in 2006. After a stint there, he moved to Club Valencia for the 2008 season of the Dhivehi League, showcasing his skills as he transitioned to New Radiant SC for the following two seasons. Returning to VB Sports Club in 2011, Arif played a pivotal role in their Dhiraagu Dhivehi League triumph that year.

His career path continued with brief spells at Eagles Sports Club in 2012 and Maziya Sports Club in 2013, where his performance led to a contract extension. In January 2014, Arif ventured internationally, joining Myanmar's Kanbawza Football Club (KBZ FC) in their premier division and Premier League setup, before returning to the Maldives and signing with Club Green Streets in May 2019. He later moved to United Victory in September 2020, further enriching his professional experience.

=== International ===
On the international stage, Arif has been a mainstay in the Maldives senior national team, known for his role as a midfielder and playmaker. His notable contributions came in the SAFF Championship, where he played a crucial part in multiple championship-winning campaigns for Maldives, including victories in 2008, 2009, 2011, 2013, 2015, and 2018. Arif's career trajectory underscores his versatility and impact both domestically and internationally, solidifying his reputation as a significant figure in Maldivian football.

== Illness and death ==
In June 2024, Arif went to perform Hajj pilgrimage in Saudi Arabia on the invitation by King Salman bin Abdulaziz Al Saud. After he returned to Maldives, it is said that he contracted a viral disease during his visit when he had to be admitted to the Intensive Care Unit of ADK Hospital. He died on 25 June 2024, while receiving treatment. Arif was 38. His death has also caused his supporters and many people to mourn and flood with Messages of Condolences, notables being the Football Association of Maldives (FAM), Maldivian President Mohamed Muizzu, Maldivian Vice President Hussain Mohamed Latheef, and AFC President Salman bin Ibrahim Al Khalifa. It was later found out through documents that the cause of his death was Meningococcal disease.

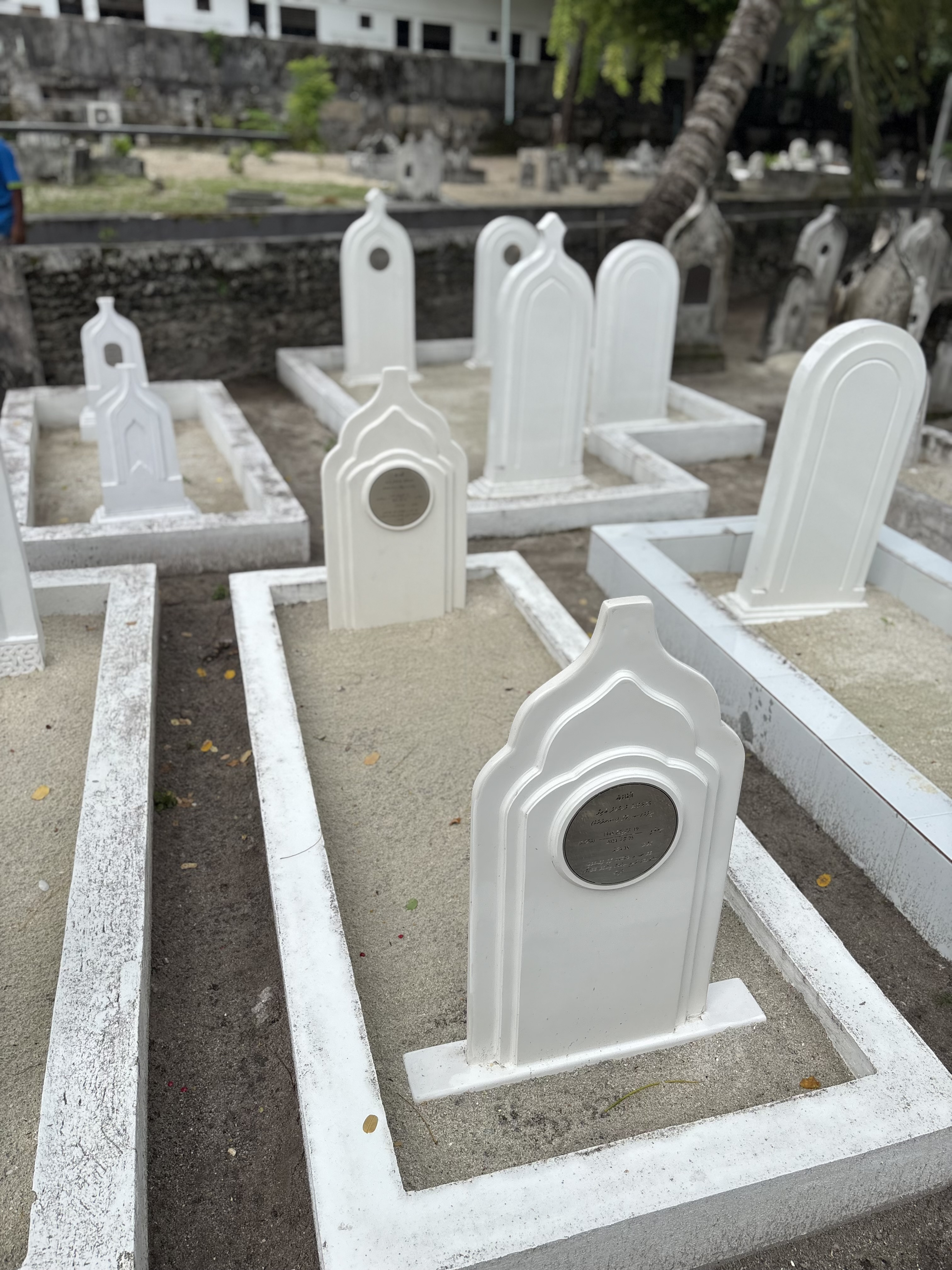
The Tomb of Mohamed Arif (Baka) at Galolhu Cemetery.

His funeral prayer was held after Fajr prayer at Masjid Al-Sultan Muhammad Thakurufaanu Al-Auzam (Islamic Centre), which was led by the Head Imam of the Islamic Centre, Sheikh Mohamed Latheef. After his funeral prayer, he was taken to be buried at Galolhu Cemetery.

== Honours ==
Maldives

- SAFF Championship: 2008, 2018

Club Valencia

- Dhivehi League: 2008
- Maldives FA Cup: 2016

Victory Sports Club

- Maldives FA Cup: 2010

VB Sports Club

- Dhivehi League: 2011
- Maldives FA Cup: 2011
- Maldivian FA Charity Shield: 2012

Maziya S&RC

- Maldives FA Cup: 2014
- Maldivian FA Charity Shield: 2017
- Malé League: 2017

Individual

- Haveeru Footballer of the Year: 2010
