= Ashraf Luthfy =

Maldivian footballer

Personal information
- Full name: Ashraf Luthfy
- Date of birth: 16 June 1973 (age 53)
- Place of birth: Maldives
- Positions: Midfielder; defender

Senior career*
Years	Team	Apps	(Gls)
1989–	Young Lagoons		
1990–1991	Florentina		
1992–1993	Club Lagoons		
–1994	Youth		
1995–1996	Victory		
1997–2003	New Radiant SC		
2004	Island FC		
2005–2006	Club Valencia		
2007	VB Sports Club		
2008–2010	Victory		
2011	Club Eagles	16	(0)
2012	Club Valencia	10	(0)

International career
1995	Maldives U23		
1993–2006	Maldives		
- * Club domestic league appearances and goals

Ashraf Luthfy (born 16 June 1973) is a Maldivian footballer who is well known by his nickname "Sampath". He plays at Club Valencia as a midfielder.

== International career ==
Ashraf Luthfy got his chance in the Maldives national football team in 1993 but, he made his debut in 1995. He has appeared in FIFA World Cup qualifying matches for the Maldives.
