= 2012 Maldives FA Cup =

Maldives FA Cup
Tournament details
- Country: Maldives
- Teams: 20

Final positions
- Champions: Maziya S&RC (1st title)
- Runners-up: Club Eagles

The 2012 Maldives FA Cup was the 25th edition of the Maldives FA Cup.

The cup winner was guaranteed a spot in the 2013 AFC Cup.

FA Cup 2012 opening that was scheduled for 2 May 2012, but was postponed to 10 May 2012, by the FAM.

== Teams ==
- Club All Youth Linkage
- Club Amigos
- Club Eagles
- Club Green Streets
- Club PK
- Club Riverside
- Club Valencia
- Hurriyya Sports Club
- Kelaa Naalhi Sports
- Kudahuvadhoo Sports Club
- Mandhoo Youth Relation
- Maziya S&RC
- Muiveyo Friends Club
- Nolhivaranfaru Youth Development
- New Radiant SC
- TC Sports Club
- VB Addu FC
- Victory SC
- Vyansa
- Youth Revolution Club

== First round proper ==
10 May 2012	Mandhoo Youth Relation	2–3	Muiveyo Friends Club	FAM No: 1 Turf pitch, Malé
16:00	Abdul Muthalib 21'; Ahmed Nazim 60'	Report	Abdulla Sujau 38'; Hassan Thaufeeq 41'; Ibrahim Latheef (yellow card) 63'; Ali Fahmee 90+1'	Referee: Ahmed Afsah

11 May 2012	TC Sports Club	1–3	Nolhivaranfaru Youth Development	Henveiru Football Ground, Malé
16:00	Sayyah Abbas (yellow card) 10'; Ahmed Sunain 13'; Ibrahim Sinan (yellow card) 26'	Report	Ahmed Waheed 41', 55'; Abdul Rahman Abdul Ghani 43'; Mohamed Riza (yellow card) 59'	Referee: Adam Fazeel

14 May 2012	Kelaa Naalhi Sports	7–1	Club Amigos	Henveiru Football Ground, Malé
16:00	Hussain Nihan 30'; Adam Nifaz 57'; Ahmed Inad 71'; Mohamed Waheed 79'; Ibrahim Haleel 82'; Ali Riyaz 89'; Ahmed Shafaq 90+2'	Report	Ibrahim Ageel 72'; Ismail Ahmed (yellow card) 77'; Ismail Irfan (yellow card) 90+2'	Referee: Ahmed Shifan

15 May 2012	Club PK	2–1	Club Green Street	Henveiru Football Ground, Malé
16:00	Mohamed Ashraf 17', ?'; Mohamed Amradh (red card) 69'	Report	Hassan Saamiu Saeed 48'	Referee: Mohamed Anil

17 May 2012	Club Riverside	0–6	Muiveyo Friends Club	Henveiru Football Ground, Malé
16:00		Report	Ibrahim Shahid 17', 50', 89'; Abdulla Sujau 21'; Ahmed Nihan 62', 65'	Referee: Ibrahim Thaufeeq

20 May 2012	Nolhivaranfaru Youth Development	3–6	Kudahuvadhoo Sports Club	Henveiru Football Ground, Malé
16:00	Abdulla Imthiyaz 3', 35'; Ali Mohamed 90+5'	Report	Hassan Hameed Ibrahim 13'; Mohamed Nabeel 19'; Ahmed Muaadh 37', 53', 79'; Mohamed Afzal 62'; Haroon Ibrahim 90'	Referee: Jaufar Rasheed

21 May 2012	Youth Revolution Club	2–6	Kelaa Naalhi Sports	Henveiru Football Ground, Malé
16:00	Ali Shareef 3'; Ahmed Rasheed 44' (pen.)	Report	Mohamed Waheed 5', 45+1'; Abdulla Ashfaq 66' (yellow card) 68'; Hussain Nihan (yellow card) 70'; Adam Nifaz 74', 81'; Ibrahim Hassan (yellow card) 43' (goal) 80'	Referee: Mohamed Anil

22 May 2012	Hurriyya Sports Club	5–0	Club PK	FAM No: 1 Turf pitch, Malé
16:00		[Report]

== Second round proper ==
In this round, the entire 8 league clubs will take part. Among the 12 non-league teams who participated in the first knockout round, Hurriyyaa SC and Muiveyo Friends Club were advanced to the second round.

7 July 2012	Club All Youth Linkage	–	Muiveyo Friends Club	TBD, Malé
		[ Report]

8 July 2012	Vyansa	–	Hurriyya Sports Club	TBD, Malé
		[ Report]

== Quarter-finals ==
11 September 2012	VB Addu FC	2-2 (4-6 pen.)	Club All Youth Linkage	Rasmee Dhandu Stadium, Malé
21:00		[Report]

12 September 2012	New Radiant SC	0-1	Club Eagles	Rasmee Dhandu Stadium, Malé
21:00		[Report]

13 September 2012	Victory SC	4-2	Club Valencia	Rasmee Dhandu Stadium, Malé
21:00		[Report]

14 September 2012	Maziya S&RC	1-0	Vyansa	Rasmee Dhandu Stadium, Malé
21:00		[Report]

== Semi-finals ==
18 October 2012	Club All Youth Linkage	1-2	Club Eagles	Rasmee Dhandu Stadium, Malé
21:00		[Report]

19 October 2012	Victory SC	1-2	Maziya S&RC	Rasmee Dhandu Stadium, Malé
21:00		Report

== Third-place play-off ==
22 October 2012	Club All Youth Linkage	4-3	Victory SC	Rasmee Dhandu Stadium, Malé
21:00		[Report]

== Final ==
23 October 2012	Club Eagles	1-2	Maziya S&RC	Rasmee Dhandu Stadium, Malé
21:00		[Report]
