= 2012 Maldives FA Cup final =

- Event: 2012 Maldives FA Cup
Club Eagles	Maziya S&RC
1	2
- Date: 23 October 2012
- Venue: Rasmee Dhandu Stadium, Malé

The 2012 Maldives FA Cup final is the 25th Final of the Maldives FA Cup.

The cup winner is guaranteed a place in the 2013 AFC Cup play-off.

== Match ==
=== Details ===
23 October 2012
21:00 UTC+5

Club Eagles	1-2	Maziya S&RC
	[ Report]

Rasmee Dhandu Stadium, Malé

== See also ==
- 2012 Maldives FA Cup
