= Pranotosh Kumar Das =

Bangladeshi footballer

Personal information
- Full name: Pranotosh Kumar Das
- Date of birth: 1 July 1982 (age 44)
- Place of birth: Bagerhat, Bangladesh
- Height: 1.75 m (5 ft 9 in)
- Position: Midfielder

Youth career
- 1996–1997: Malibagh

Senior career*
Years	Team	Apps	(Gls)
1997–2000	Arambagh KS		
2001–2002	Badda Jagoroni		
2001–2004	Dhaka Abahani		
2004–2005	Brothers Union		
2005–2021	Dhaka Abahani		

International career^{‡}
2009–2016	Bangladesh	11	(1)
- * Club domestic league appearances and goals ‡ National team caps and goals as of 1 September 2016

Pranotosh Kumar Das is a retired Bangladeshi footballer who plays as a midfielder. He last played for Abahani Limited Dhaka. He scored his first international goal against Bhutan during 2009 SAFF Championship.
