= Kim Nørholt =

Danish footballer (born 1972)

Personal information
- Full name: Kim Nørholt
- Date of birth: 30 April 1972 (age 54)
- Place of birth: Denmark
- Height: 1.80 m (5 ft 11 in)
- Position: Midfielder

Senior career*
Years	Team	Apps	(Gls)
1991–1996	Vejle Boldklub		
1997–2000	Silkeborg IF		
2001–2002	Kolding FC (Note: "Kolding IF" until 1 January 2002)		
2002–2005	FC Fredericia		
2005	Fram Reykjavík		

Managerial career
- 2016: TSIF Fodbold
- 2016–2017: Fredericia KFUM
- * Club domestic league appearances and goals

Kim Nørholt (born 30 April 1972) is a Danish football manager and former player.

== Playing career ==
Nørholt, who played as a midfielder, started his senior career with Vejle Boldklub. In 1997, he signed for Silkeborg IF in the Danish Superliga, where he made 67 league appearances and scored ten goals. He subsequently spent time with he played for Kolding FC, Fredericia, Knattspyrnufélagið Fram, and Club Lagoons.
