= Adam Lareef =

Maldivian footballer

Personal information
- Date of birth: 1 July 1980 (age 46)
- Place of birth: Maldives
- Height: 1.62 m (5 ft 4 in)
- Position: Striker

Team information
- Current team: VB Addu

Youth career
- 2008: Victory
- 2008–2009: VB Addu
- 2009–2011: Club Valencia
- 2011–: VB Addu

International career
| Years | Team | Apps | (Gls) |
| 2009 | Maldives | 2 | (0) |

Adam Lareef (born 1 July 1980) is a footballer. A striker, he currently plays at the club level for VB Addu.
