= Mohamed Umair =

Maldivian footballer

Personal information
- Date of birth: 3 July 1988 (age 38)
- Place of birth: Malé, Maldives
- Height: 1.64 m (5 ft 5 in)
- Positions: Attacking midfielder; utility player

Team information
- Current team: Victory
- Number: 10

Senior career*
Years	Team	Apps	(Gls)
2006–2009	Victory		
2010	VB Sports Club	12	(3)
2011	Maziya	23	(8)
2012	Victory	27	(26)
2013–2015	New Radiant	63	(37)
2015–2022	Maziya	13	(4)
2022	→ Club Valencia (loan)		
2023–2024	Victory		

International career^{‡}
2009–2010	Maldives U23		
2007–2022	Maldives	78	(9)
- * Club domestic league appearances and goals ‡ National team caps and goals as of 14 December 2022

Mohamed Umair (born 3 July 1988) is a Maldivian professional footballer. In his career Umair has played as a defender, midfielder, and forward.

== International career ==
Umair made his debut for Maldives on 8 October 2007, in a 2010 FIFA World Cup qualification match against Yemem and later he was substituted for Mukhthar Naseer in the 60th minute at the Ali Muhsin Al-Muriasi Stadium.

He has represented his country at the 2011 SAFF Championship and the 2013 SAFF Championship. In the latter tournament he scored a goal from a free kick against Bhutan to tie the score up at 2–2. Maldives went on to win the game 8–2.

=== International goals ===
Scores and results list Maldives' goal tally first.

No	Date	Venue	Opponent	Score	Result	Competition
1.	18 April 2009	National Football Stadium, Malé, Maldives	Bhutan	5–0	5–0	2010 AFC Challenge Cup qualification
2.	14 February 2013	National Football Stadium, Malé, Maldives	Pakistan	1–0	3–0	Friendly
3.	4 September 2013	Dasarath Rangasala Stadium, Kathmandu, Nepal	Bhutan	2–2	8–2	2013 SAFF Championship
4.	19 May 2014	National Football Stadium, Malé, Maldives	Myanmar	2–1	3–2	2014 AFC Challenge Cup
5.	27 May 2014	National Football Stadium, Malé, Maldives	Philippines	1–1	2–3 (a.e.t.)	2014 AFC Challenge Cup
–	31 July 2015	Stade Jean-Allane, Saint-Benoît, Réunion	Mayotte	1–0	1–3	2015 IOIG (Non-FIFA)
–	2 August 2015	Stade Baby-Larivière, Saint-Andre, Réunion	Seychelles	1–1	2–1	2015 IOIG (Non-FIFA)
6.	23 March 2018	National Stadium, Kallang, Singapore	Singapore	1–1	2–3	Friendly

== Achievements ==
In 2013 Umair won the best player award in the Maldives for his performance with VB Sports Club in the past season. He also won the golden boot award with 26 goals in the season.
