= 2009 SAFF Championship =

Tournament details
- Host country: Bangladesh
- Dates: 4–13 December
- Teams: 8
- Venue: 1 (in 1 host city)

Final positions
- Champions: India U23 (5th title)
- Runners-up: Maldives

Tournament statistics
- Matches played: 15
- Goals scored: 42 (2.8 per match)
- Top scorer(s): (Bangladesh) Enamul Haque (Maldives) Ahmed Thariq (Sri Lanka) Channa Ediri Bandanage (4 goals each)
- Best player: (India) Arindam Bhattacharya

The 2009 South Asian Football Federation Championship was hosted by Bangladesh from 4 to 13 December 2009. Bangladesh was awarded to host the tournament after the withdrawal of original hosts India.

After India's reluctance to host the tournament, in May 2009, at the Asian Football Confederation (AFC) Congress in Kuala Lumpur, Malaysia, Bangladesh Football Federation (BFF) president Kazi Salahuddin on his return from the AFC Congress informed that although India were still retaining their status as hosts of the championship, Bangladesh and Nepal had turned in fresh bids in anticipation of staging this prestigious eight-nation meet.

A decision was taken at the FIFA Congress in Bahamas in the first week of June but no announcement was officially made. In July, with the tournament drawing ever closer, media reports once again suggested that the tournament would be moved once again to Bangladesh, as Pakistan would struggle to obtain visas if the tournament is hosted in India.

On 31 August 2009, it was reported that the tournament would be held in Bangladesh, after the Indian football association (AIFF) had its annual congress at the end of August. This was formally confirmed by the AFC on 10 September through a press release.

== Venue ==
The Bangabandhu National Stadium in Dhaka was the only venue for the tournament. It is also home venue for Bangladesh national football team.

Dhaka
Bangabandhu National Stadium
Capacity: 36,000
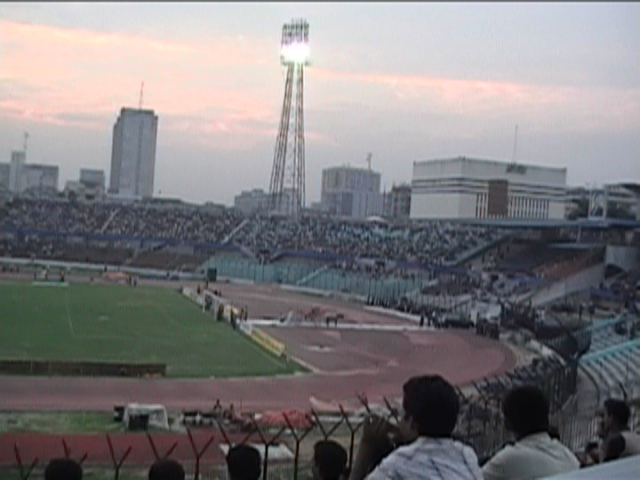

== Draw ==
The draw for the tournament was made on 3 October 2009. India took part with their U-23 team

Group A	Group B
Afghanistan (unseeded); India U23 (1st seed); Maldives (2nd seed); Nepal (unseeded)	Bangladesh (1st seed); Bhutan (unseeded); Pakistan (unseeded); Sri Lanka (2nd seed)

== Group stage ==
=== Group A ===
Team	Pld	W	D	L	GF	GA	GD	Pts
Maldives	3	2	1	0	6	2	+4	7
India U23	3	2	0	1	2	2	0	6
Nepal	3	1	1	1	4	2	+2	4
Afghanistan	3	0	0	3	1	7	−6	0

Source: RSSSF
5 December 2009
16:00

Maldives	1–1	Nepal
Thariq 61'	Report	J.M. Rai 68'

Bangabandhu National Stadium, Dhaka
5 December 2009
18:00

India U23	1–0	Afghanistan
Lalpekhlua 86'	Report

Bangabandhu National Stadium, Dhaka

7 December 2009
16:00

Maldives	3–1	Afghanistan
Thariq 52'; Ashfaq 69', 89'	Report	Barakzai 30'

Bangabandhu National Stadium, Dhaka
7 December 2009
18:00

India U23	1–0	Nepal
Sushil 18'	Report

Bangabandhu National Stadium, Dhaka

9 December 2009
16:00

Afghanistan	0–3	Nepal
	Report	A. Gurung 55', 73'; B. Gurung 56'

Bangabandhu National Stadium, Dhaka
9 December 2009
18:00

Maldives	2–0	India U23
Thariq 15'; Fazeel 82'	Report

Bangabandhu National Stadium, Dhaka

=== Group B ===
Team	Pld	W	D	L	GF	GA	GD	Pts
Bangladesh	3	2	1	0	6	2	+4	7
Sri Lanka	3	2	0	1	8	2	+6	6
Pakistan	3	1	1	1	7	1	+6	4
Bhutan	3	0	0	3	1	17	−16	0

Source: RSSSF
4 December 2009
16:00

Sri Lanka	1–0	Pakistan
Gunarathne 23'	Report

Bangabandhu National Stadium, Dhaka
4 December 2009
18:00

Bangladesh	4–1	Bhutan
Pranotosh 11'; Enamul 22', 51'; Ameli 72'	Report	Dendup 42' (pen.)

Bangabandhu National Stadium, Dhaka

6 December 2009
16:00

Sri Lanka	6–0	Bhutan
Channa 7', 25'; Kasun 39', 66', 78'; Gunarathne 90'	Report

Bangabandhu National Stadium, Dhaka
6 December 2009
18:00

Bangladesh	0–0	Pakistan
	Report

Bangabandhu National Stadium, Dhaka

8 December 2009
16:00

Pakistan	7–0	Bhutan
Essa 21', 54'; Ashraf 23'; Mehmood 28', 35', 66'; S. Khan 45'	Report

Bangabandhu National Stadium, Dhaka
8 December 2009
18:00

Bangladesh	2–1	Sri Lanka
Enamul 8', 64'	Report	Channa 42'

Bangabandhu National Stadium, Dhaka

== Knockout stage ==
Semi-finals
11 Dec – Dhaka
Maldives	5
Sri Lanka	1
11 Dec – Dhaka
Bangladesh	0
India U23	1

Final
13 Dec – Dhaka
Maldives	0 (1)
India U23 (p)	0 (3)

=== Semi-finals ===
11 December 2009
16:00

Maldives	5–1	Sri Lanka
Thariq 21'; Fazeel 63', 85' (pen.); Ashfaq 76'; Ashad 87'	Report	Channa 62'

Bangabandhu National Stadium, Dhaka
11 December 2009
19:30

Bangladesh	0–1	India U23
	Report	Sushil 63'

Bangabandhu National Stadium, Dhaka

=== Final ===
13 December 2009
19:00

Maldives	0–0 (a.e.t.)	India U23
	Report
Penalties
Fazeel (penalty scored); Thariq (penalty missed); Mukhthar (penalty missed); Ashfaq (penalty missed)	1–3	(penalty scored) Jibon; (penalty scored) Denzil; (penalty missed) Nirmal; (penalty scored) Subodh

Bangabandhu National Stadium, Dhaka

== Champion ==
SAFF Championship 2009

India
Fifth title

== Goalscorers ==
4 goals

- (Bangladesh) Enamul Haque
- (Maldives) Ahmed Thariq
- (Sri Lanka) Channa Ediri Bandanage

3 goals

- (Maldives) Ali Ashfaq
- (Maldives) Ibrahim Fazeel
- (Pakistan) Arif Mehmood
- (Sri Lanka) Kasun Jayasuriya

2 goals

- (India) Sushil Kumar Singh
- (Nepal) Anil Gurung
- (Pakistan) Muhammad Essa
- (Sri Lanka) Chathura Gunarathne

1 goal

- (Afghanistan) Hashmatullah Barakzai
- (Bangladesh) Jahid Hasan Ameli
- (Bangladesh) Pranotosh Kumar Das
- (Bhutan) Nawang Dendup
- (India) Jeje Lalpekhlua
- (Maldives) Ashad Ali
- (Nepal) Bijaya Gurung
- (Nepal) Ju Manu Rai
- (Pakistan) Reis Ashraf
- (Pakistan) Shabir Khan
