= Imran Mohamed =

Maldivian footballer

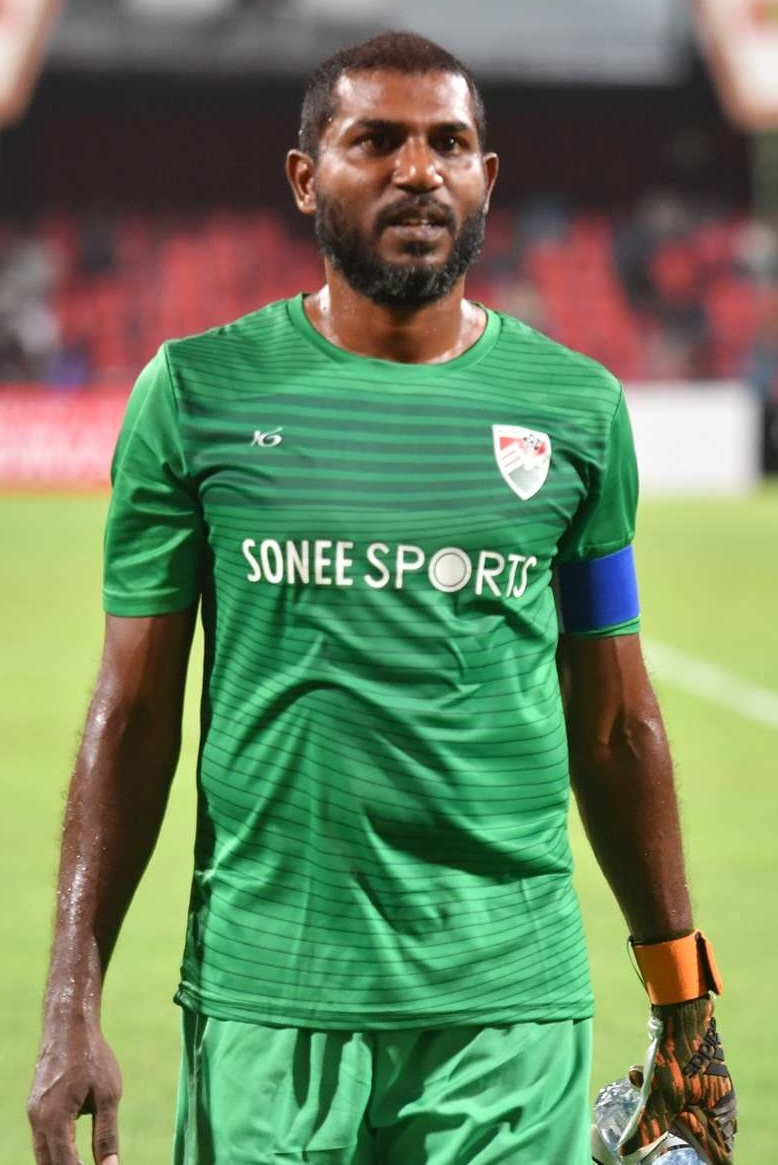
- Mohamed in 2018 during his retirement match

Personal information
- Full name: Imran Mohamed
- Date of birth: 18 December 1980 (age 45)
- Place of birth: Mahibadhoo, Maldives
- Height: 1.88 m (6 ft 2 in)
- Position: Goalkeeper

Youth career
- Club Eagles

Senior career*
Years	Team	Apps	(Gls)
1999–2001	Club Eagles	18	(0)
2002–2008	Victory	90	(0)
2004	→ Club Valencia (loan)	1	(0)
2009–2010	Club Valencia	22	(0)
2010–2011	VB Sports Club	?	(1)
2012–2015	New Radiant SC	22	(1)
2015–2016	Maziya S&RC	?	(?)
2017–2018	New Radiant SC	?	(?)
2019	TC Sports Club	?	(?)
Total		153+	(2)

International career
2000–2016	Maldives	110	(0)
- * Club domestic league appearances and goals

Imran Mohamed (born 18 December 1980) is a Maldivian former professional footballer who played as a goalkeeper. Considered as one of the greatest Maldivian goalkeepers, he earned 110 international caps for the national team.

== Club career ==
Imran has scored a goal whilst being in his own penalty area in the match against Victory Sports Club in President's Cup. He scored the goal from 115 yards. Victory SC's coach Ali Suzain said that the goal was due to Victory Sports Club keeper Faisal's mistake which has cost a goal.

== International career ==
In 2008, the Maldives national team won the SAFF Championship for the first time. Imran made some wonderful saves in the final and the semifinal. Many Sri Lankan coaches who previously coached in the Maldives consider his wonderful saves the reason why the whole Maldivian nation rejoiced when the team won the championship.

He was a member of the Maldives national football team. Imran retired from national team on 12 Oct 2016 after being the first choice national goalkeeper for almost 17 years.

== Retirement match ==
In December 2018 Maldivian president Ibrahim Solih attended a retirement match of Imran Mohamed at National Football Stadium. Organized by the Football Association of Maldives, the match was held in his honour against a team led by Spain's right back, Míchel Salgado. Imran's team won with four goals and conceding three.

Prior to the match, the president presented a plaque of appreciation to Imran, who likewise also presented the president with the gloves used by him when his team defeated India in the 2008 SAFF Championship final. Imran also donated Maldivian national team jerseys to Michel Salgado and Peter Schmeichel.

== See also ==
- List of men's footballers with 100 or more international caps
