= Mohamed Nizam =

Maldivian football Coach

Personal information
- Full name: Mohamed Nizam
- Date of birth: 2 September 1972 (age 54)
- Place of birth: Feydhoo/Addu City, Maldives
- Height: 1.78 m (5 ft 10 in)
- Position: Forward

Team information
- Current team: Buru Sports Club (head coach)
- Number: 2

Senior career*
Years	Team	Apps	(Gls)
1992–1994	Club Lagoons	?	(?)
1994–1995	New radiant sports club		
1995-1997	Youth Sports Club		
1997–2000	Club Valencia		
2000–2001	Island FC		
- VB Sports Club

International career
1997–2001	Maldives	39	(9)

Managerial career
- 2024–2025: Maldives Women
- * Club domestic league appearances and goals

Mohamed Nizam (born 9 September 1972) is a Maldivian former footballer who played as a forward. He has served as the head coach for the Maldives under-16 and under-19 teams and is the head coach for the Maldives women's national team. He was twice awarded Maldives Football Coach of the Year—2016 and 2018.

== Career statistics ==
=== Managerial ===
As of match played 3 April 2021

Managerial record by club and tenure
Team	From	To	Record					Ref.
Team	From	To	M	W	D	L	Win %	Ref.
TC Sports Club	2014	15 January 2019	109	63	22	24	57.80	
Maldives U16	8 August 2019	6 November 2020	3	0	0	3	0.00	
Saif SC	7 November 2019	2 January 2020	3	1	1	1	33.33	
Maziya S&RC	21 July 2020	27 December 2020	4	2	1	1	50.00	
TC Sports Club	29 January 2021	Present	3	1	0	2	33.33	
Total			122	67	24	31	54.92	

== International goals ==
No.	Date	Venue	Opponent	Score	Result	Competition
1.	9 September 1997	Kathmandu, Nepal	India	2–2	2–2	1997 South Asian Football Federation Gold Cup
2.	10 September 1997	Kathmandu, Nepal	Sri Lanka	2–1	2–1	1997 South Asian Football Federation Gold Cup

== Honours ==
Preceded by Shah Ismail	Haveeru Maldivian Footballer of the Year; 2001	Succeeded by Ali Shiham
