= Maldives FA Cup =

- Organiser(s): Football Association of Maldives
- Founded: 1988; 38 years ago
- Region: Maldives
- Teams: 8 (2026)
- Qualifier for: AFC Challenge League; Maldivian FA Charity Shield
- Current champions: Maziya (3rd title)
- Most championships: New Radiant (12 titles)
- Broadcaster: Yes TV
- 2026 Maldives FA Cup

The Maldives FA Cup is the premier domestic knockout football competition in the Maldives, organized by the Football Association of Maldives. It was established in 1988 and is contested by clubs from the Maldivian football league system.

The competition is contested by clubs from various levels of the Maldivian football league system and follows a single-elimination format. Over the years, it has served as a key pathway for qualification to continental competitions such as the AFC Cup.

New Radiant Sports Club is the most successful club in the history of the competition, having won the title a record 12 times.

== History ==
The Maldives FA Cup was inaugurated in 1988 during a period of growing organization in Maldivian football. Prior to its establishment, domestic competitions were largely limited in scope, and the introduction of a nationwide knockout tournament marked a significant step in the development of the sport.

The early editions of the competition were dominated by clubs such as Club Valencia, New Radiant SC, and Club Lagoons. These teams formed the foundation of competitive football in the country and contributed to establishing the FA Cup as a major national event.

During the 2000s, the Maldives FA Cup experienced significant growth in both participation and structure. Clubs from multiple divisions were included, with preliminary rounds allowing lower-tier teams to compete alongside top-flight sides.

This period saw the rise of Victory Sports Club and continued success for New Radiant SC, both of whom became dominant forces in domestic cup competitions. The tournament also became more formally integrated into the national football calendar, increasing its importance within the domestic season.

From the 2010s onward, the FA Cup became closely linked with continental qualification pathways, particularly for the AFC Cup. Winning the competition often provided clubs with opportunities to compete at the Asian level.

However, the tournament experienced several disruptions. The late 2010s saw irregular scheduling, and the 2020 edition was cancelled due to the COVID-19 pandemic. In subsequent years, the competition underwent restructuring, with a revival in the early 2020s aimed at restoring its status as a major domestic tournament.

== Competition format ==
The Maldives FA Cup is played as a knockout competition, with teams progressing through successive rounds culminating in a final.

The structure has varied over time, but generally includes preliminary rounds featuring lower-division teams, entry of top-tier clubs in later rounds, quarter-finals, semi-finals, and final. Matches are typically decided over a single leg, with extra time and penalties used to determine a winner if necessary.

== Previous winners ==
Previous winners are:

Year	Winning club	Ref.
1988	Club Valencia	
1989	New Radiant	
1990	Club Lagoons	
1991	New Radiant	
1992	Club Lagoons	
1993	Victory Sports Club	
1994	New Radiant	
1995	Club Valencia	
1996	New Radiant	
1997	New Radiant	
1998	New Radiant	
1999	Club Valencia	
2000	Victory Sports Club	
2001	New Radiant	
2002	Island FC	
2003	Island FC	
2004	Club Valencia	
2005	New Radiant	
2006	New Radiant	
2007	New Radiant	
2008	New Radiant	
2009	Victory Sports Club	
2010	Victory Sports Club	
2011	VB Sports Club	
2012	Maziya S&RC	
2013	New Radiant	
2014	Maziya	
2016	Club Valencia	
2017	New Radiant	
2020	Nulled due to COVID-19 pandemic	
2022	Maziya	
2026	New Radiant S.C.	

== Number of titles ==
- New Radiant (13)
- Club Valencia (5)
- Victory Sports Club (4)
- VB Addu FC (4)*
- Maziya (3)
- Club Lagoons (2)
