= Ismail Mohamed (footballer) =

Maldivian footballer

Personal information
- Full name: Ismail Mohamed
- Date of birth: 16 March 1980 (age 46)
- Place of birth: Thinadhoo, Maldives
- Height: 1.60 m (5 ft 3 in)
- Position: Winger

Team information
- Current team: Victory
- Number: 21

Youth career
- 2001–2003: Victory
- 2004: Island FC
- 2005–2006: Victory
- 2007: VB Sports
- 2008–2010: Victory
- 2011–: VB Sports

International career
Years	Team	Apps	(Gls)
2004–	Maldives	11	(2)

Ismail Mohamed (born 16 March 1980) is a Maldivian footballer. An attacking midfielder, he currently plays at the club level for VB Sports Club. He is also part of the Maldivian National Football Team.

== Honours ==
Maldives

- SAFF Championship: 2008
