= Shamweel Qasim =

Maldivian footballer

Personal information
- Full name: Shamweel Qasim
- Date of birth: 20 June 1982 (age 44)
- Place of birth: Hithadhoo, Addu, Maldives
- Position: Midfielder

Team information
- Current team: Club Eagles
- Number: 6

Senior career*
| Years | Team | Apps | (Gls) |
| 2001–2007 | Island FC | ? | (?) |
| 2008–2009 | New Radiant SC | 30 | (13) |
| 2010 | Club Valencia | 19 | (8) |
| 2011–2012 | VB Sports Club | 37 | (24) |
| 2013 | Club Valencia | 0 | (3) |
| 2014 | New Radiant SC | 0 | (3) |
| 2015–2017 | TC Sports Club | | |
| 2025– | Club Eagles | 2 | (1) |

International career
| 2005–2014 | Maldives | ? | (4) |
- * Club domestic league appearances and goals

Shamweel Qasim, nicknamed Bonda is a Maldivian footballer, who plays as midfielder for Club Eagles. He was a former player of the Maldives national football team. He was in the 2008 squad which won Maldives their first gold in SAFF Championship.

He announced his retirement from playing after the 2017 season. He returned to playing in December 2025, to play under Abdulla Haneef at Eagles.

== Personal life ==
Shamweel is from the island of Hithadhoo, Addu City. He is married to Noora Jaleel and has two kids.

== Honours ==
Maldives

- SAFF Championship: 2008
