= List of football clubs in the Maldives =

This is a list of football clubs in Maldives, which compete in the various divisions of Maldivian football league system.

== A ==
- Atolls FC
- Anakee SC

== B ==
- B.G. Sports Club
- Buru Sports Club
- Biss Buru Sports Club
- Blue Sports Club

== C ==
- Club All Youth Linkage
- Club Eagles
- Club Green Streets
- Club Lagoons
- Club Valencia
- Club Teenage
- Challengers SC
- Club Amigos
- Club Park Kanmathi

== D ==
- Da Grande Sports Club
- Dhidhdhoo Sports

== G ==
- Gadhdhoo Recreation Club
- GB Sports
- Galolhu Kanmathi
- Gan

== H ==
- Hinnavaru
- Hurriyya SC

== I ==
- Island Football Club

== J ==
- JJ Sports Club

== L ==
- Lagoons Sports Club
- LT Sports Club
- LC Sports Club
- Lorenzo Sports Club

== M ==
- Maavah
- Maziya Sports & Recreation Club
- Mahibadhoo Sports Club
- Manadhoo Sports Club
- Meyree Sports Club
- Maafannu Central United
- Muiveyo FC

== N ==
- New Lagoons
- New Radiant SC

== O ==
- Odi Sports Club

== T ==
- Thoddoo FC
- Tent Sports Club
- T.F.T Sports Club

== U ==
- United Victory
- United Henverians

== V ==
- VB Addu FC (defunct)
- Vilimale' United
- Victory Sports Club

== Z ==
- Zefrol
