= Ahmed Thoriq =

Maldivian footballer

Personal information
- Date of birth: 4 October 1980 (age 46)
- Place of birth: Mahibadhoo, Alif Dhaal Atoll, Maldives
- Height: 1.78 m (5 ft 10 in)
- Position: Forward

Youth career
- CHSE

Senior career*
| Years | Team | Apps | (Gls) |
| 2004–2006 | New Radiant | ? | (?) |
| 2006–2007 | Mahibadhoo ZJ | ? | (?) |
| 2007–2009 | New Radiant | ? | (?) |
| 2010–2010 | VB Sports | ? | (2) |
| 2010–2013 | New Radiant | ? | (17) |

International career
| 2003–2013 | Maldives | 35 | (16) |
- * Club domestic league appearances and goals

Ahmed Thoriq (born 4 October 1980) is a Maldivian retired professional footballer, nicknamed "Tom". He has been the member of parliament for the Mahibadhoo constituency since 2014, and he is the president of the Football Association of Maldives, having been elected in 2025.

== Biography ==
He is from the island of Mahibadhoo in Alif Dhaal Atoll.

== International career ==
His first competitive international tournament was the 2003 South Asian Football Federation Championship held in Bangladesh. He made only one appearance in the competition, by replacing Ali Umar as a substitute in their first match where they won 6–0 to Bhutan. He also was the joint top scorer in the 2005 with the fellow national teammates Ali Ashfaq and Ibrahim Fazeel with 3 goals, and 2009 SAFF Championship with Enamul Haque and Channa Ediri Bandanage by scoring a total of 4 goals.

He officially retired from the national team, on 14 February 2013 with the teammate Assad Abdul Ghanee, after the friendly match played between Pakistan at Rasmee Dhandu Stadium. He was awarded with a "golden plaque" by Football Association of Maldives as recognition of his contribution to the national team.

== Career statistics ==
=== International ===
Appearances and goals by national team and year
| National team | Year | Apps | Goals |
|---|---|---|---|
| Maldives | 2003 | 4 | 2 |
| Maldives | 2004 | 3 | 1 |
| Maldives | 2005 | 4 | 3 |
| Maldives | 2008 | 5 | 1 |
| Maldives | 2009 | 8 | 4 |
| Maldives | 2011 | 9 | 5 |
| Maldives | 2012 | 1 | 0 |
| Maldives | 2013 | 1 | 0 |
| Total | | 35 | 16 |

Scores and results list Maldives' goal tally first, score column indicates score after each Thoriq goal.

List of international goals scored by Ahmed Thoriq
| No. | Date | Venue | Opponent | Score | Result | Competition | Ref. |
|---|---|---|---|---|---|---|---|
| 1 | 3 December 2003 | National Football Stadium, Malé, Maldives | Mongolia | 9–0 | 12–0 | 2006 FIFA World Cup qualification | |
| 2 | 3 December 2003 | National Football Stadium, Malé, Maldives | Mongolia | 11–0 | 12–0 | 2006 FIFA World Cup qualification | |
| 3 | 13 October 2004 | National Football Stadium, Malé, Maldives | Vietnam | 1–0 | 3–0 | 2006 FIFA World Cup qualification | |
| 4 | 7 December 2005 | People's Football Stadium, Karachi, Pakistan | Afghanistan | 5–1 | 9–1 | 2005 SAFF Gold Cup | |
| 5 | 7 December 2005 | People's Football Stadium, Karachi, Pakistan | Afghanistan | 6–1 | 9–1 | 2005 SAFF Gold Cup | |
| 6 | 7 December 2005 | People's Football Stadium, Karachi, Pakistan | Afghanistan | 8–1 | 9–1 | 2005 SAFF Gold Cup | |
| 7 | 3 June 2008 | National Football Stadium, Malé, Maldives | Pakistan | 2–0 | 3–0 | 2008 SAFF Championship | |
| 8 | 5 December 2009 | National Stadium, Dhaka, Bangladesh | Nepal | 1–0 | 1–1 | 2009 SAFF Championship | |
| 9 | 7 December 2009 | National Stadium, Dhaka, Bangladesh | Afghanistan | 1–1 | 3–1 | 2009 SAFF Championship | |
| 10 | 9 December 2009 | National Stadium, Dhaka, Bangladesh | India U23 | 1–0 | 2–0 | 2009 SAFF Championship | |
| 11 | 11 December 2009 | National Stadium, Dhaka, Bangladesh | Sri Lanka | 1–0 | 5–1 | 2009 SAFF Championship | |
| 12 | 6 August 2011 | Stade Linité, Victoria, Seychelles | Comoros | 1–0 | 2–2 | 2011 Indian Ocean Island Games | |
| 13 | 22 November 2011 | National Stadium, Dhaka, Bangladesh | Seychelles | 1–0 | 3–0 | Friendly | |
| 14 | 22 November 2011 | National Stadium, Dhaka, Bangladesh | Seychelles | 2–0 | 3–0 | Friendly | |
| 15 | 6 December 2011 | Jawaharlal Nehru Stadium, New Delhi, India | Bangladesh | 1–0 | 3–1 | 2011 SAFF Championship | |
| 16 | 6 December 2011 | Jawaharlal Nehru Stadium, New Delhi, India | Bangladesh | 2–0 | 3–1 | 2011 SAFF Championship | |

== Honours ==
Maldives

- SAFF Championship: 2008
