= Club Lagoons =

Maldivian football club

- Full name: Club Lagoons
- Nickname(s): Lagoons
- Founded: 1982; 43 years ago
- Dissolved: 1997
- Ground: Galolhu Stadium, Maldives
- Capacity: 11, 850
Home colours	Away colours

Club Lagoons was a Maldivian football club based in Malé. They were one of the leading teams in Maldives during the 1980s and 1990s. They were relegated in 1996. Unable regain top flight status, the team never competed again.

== Achievements ==
- Maldives National Championship: 1
  - 1989
- Maldives FA Cup: 2
  - 1990, 1992

== Performance in AFC competitions ==
- Asian Club Championship: 1 appearance

1990–91: Qualifying stage

- Asian Cup Winners Cup: 1 appearance

1994–95: Preliminary round

== Notable former players ==
- (Denmark) Kim Nørholt
