= Ibrahim Fazeel =

Maldivian footballer (born 1980)

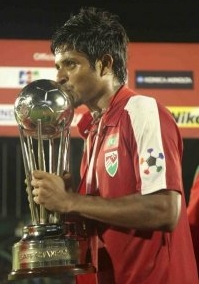
- Fazeel celebrating the SAFF Championship win in 2008

Personal information
- Full name: Ibrahim Fazeel
- Date of birth: 9 October 1980 (age 46)
- Place of birth: Malé, Maldives
- Height: 1.78 m (5 ft 10 in)
- Position: Attacking midfielder

Team information
- Current team: Llangefni Town
- Number: 99

Youth career
- Majeediya School

Senior career*
Years	Team	Apps	(Gls)
2000	New Lagoons		(6)
2001–2003	Island Football Club		(44)
2004–2006	New Radiant		(60)
2007	VB Sports Club		(18)
2007–2008	DPMM FC		(2)
2008–2011	Victory Sports Club		(79)
2012	New Radiant		(8)
2013	B.G. Sports Club		(4)
2014	New Radiant		(6)
2015	New Radiant		(4)
2015	Bodorgan FC	7	(6)
2017	Llangefni Town FC		
2017–	New Radiant		

International career^{‡}
2000–2014	Maldives	72	(22)
- * Club domestic league appearances and goals ‡ National team caps and goals as of 5 February 2015

Ibrahim Fazeel (born 9 October 1980) is a Maldivian footballer nicknamed "Oppo". He can play both as a midfielder and as a forward currently who plays for Llangefni Town FC. He started his career while he was a student in Majeediyya School in 1999. Fazeel played his first international match on 2 April 2000 against Syria (AFC Asian Cup Lebanon 2000) and scored first goal in the Golden jubilee international tournament against Bangladesh. He is the only player who scored for times in the semi-finals to take Maldives to the finals.

After his international duty in 1999, he signed for his first club New lagoons in 2000. Between 2001 and 2003 he played for IFC which was the best club at that time. From 2004 to 2006 he changed to New Radiant SC. In 2007, a new club named VB signed him for a record fee. In October 2007, he transferred to DPMM FC in Brunei along with fellow Maldivian Ali Ashfaq and scored two goals for the team. In 2008, Fazeel lend his team to travel to final in SAFF Championship 2008 by scoring a goal against Sri Lanka. From 2008 to 2011 he played for Victory SC. Later in 2012, he played for New Radiant SC along with his National teammates Ashfaq and Ahmed Thoriq and played for BG Sports in 2013 and returned to his old team New Radiant SC He was one of the most important members of the Maldives national football team.

At the 2014 AFC Challenge Cup, Fazeel helped the Maldives National Football Team by scoring a penalty kick which led the team to 3rd place against Afghanistan by 1–1 (8–7)

== Club career ==
Anglesey League club Bodorgan FC acquired the signature of Fazeel on 7 February 2016.

On 20 January 2017, Welsh Alliance side Llangefni Town F.C. completed the signing of Fazeel.

== Career statistics ==
=== International ===
Appearances and goals by national team and year
National team	Year	Apps	Goals
Maldives	2000	4	1
Maldives	2001	4	0
Maldives	2002	2	0
Maldives	2003	10	3
Maldives	2004	7	1
Maldives	2005	3	3
Maldives	2007	1	0
Maldives	2008	7	3
Maldives	2009	9	7
Maldives	2010	1	0
Maldives	2011	16	4
Maldives	2012	1	0
Maldives	2014	6	0
Total		71	22

Scores and results list Maldives's goal tally first, score column indicates score after each Fazeel goal.

List of international goals scored by Ibrahim Fazeel
No.	Date	Venue	Opponent	Score	Result	Competition	Ref.
1	4 May 2000	Galolhu Football Stadium, Malé, Maldives	Bangladesh	1-1	1-1	Friendly	
2	8 January 2003	Bangabandhu National Stadium, Dhaka, Bangladesh	Pakistan	1-0	1-0	2003 South Asian Football Federation Gold Cup	
3	3 December 2003	Galolhu Football Stadium, Malé, Maldives	Mongolia	3-0	12-0	2006 FIFA World Cup qualification	
4	3 December 2003	Galolhu Football Stadium, Malé, Maldives	Mongolia	4-0	12-0	2006 FIFA World Cup qualification	
5	8 September 2004	Galolhu Football Stadium, Malé, Maldives	Lebanon	1-5	2-5	2006 FIFA World Cup qualification	
6	7 December 2005	People's Football Stadium, Karachi, Pakistan	Afghanistan	2-0	9-1	2005 South Asian Football Federation Gold Cup	
7	7 December 2005	People's Football Stadium, Karachi, Pakistan	Afghanistan	4-1	9-1	2005 South Asian Football Federation Gold Cup	
8	7 December 2005	People's Football Stadium, Karachi, Pakistan	Afghanistan	7-1	9-1	2005 South Asian Football Federation Gold Cup	
9	5 June 2008	Galolhu Football Stadium, Malé, Maldives	Nepal	3-1	4-1	2008 SAFF Championship	
10	5 June 2008	Galolhu Football Stadium, Malé, Maldives	Nepal	4-1	4-1	2008 SAFF Championship	
11	11 June 2008	Sugathadasa Stadium, Colombo, Sri Lanka	Sri Lanka	1-0	1-0	2008 SAFF Championship	
12	14 April 2009	Galolhu Football Stadium, Malé, Maldives	Turkmenistan	1-2	1-3	2010 AFC Challenge Cup qualification	
13	16 April 2009	Galolhu Football Stadium, Malé, Maldives	Philippines	1-1	3-2	2010 AFC Challenge Cup qualification	
14	18 April 2009	Galolhu Football Stadium, Malé, Maldives	Bhutan	3-0	5-0	2010 AFC Challenge Cup qualification	
15	18 April 2009	Galolhu Football Stadium, Malé, Maldives	Bhutan	4-0	5-0	2010 AFC Challenge Cup qualification	
16	9 December 2009	Bangabandhu National Stadium, Dhaka, Bangladesh	India U23	2-0	2-0	2009 SAFF Championship	
17	11 December 2009	Bangabandhu National Stadium, Dhaka, Bangladesh	Sri Lanka	2-1	5-1	2009 SAFF Championship	
18	11 December 2009	Bangabandhu National Stadium, Dhaka, Bangladesh	Sri Lanka	4-1	5-1	2009 SAFF Championship	
19	6 August 2011	Stade Linité, Victoria, Seychelles	Comoros	2-1	2-2	2011 Indian Ocean Island Games	
20	9 August 2011	Stade Linité, Victoria, Seychelles	Seychelles	1-2	1-5	2011 Indian Ocean Island Games	
21	24 November 2011	Galolhu Football Stadium, Malé, Maldives	Seychelles	1-1	2-1	Friendly	
22	24 November 2011	Galolhu Football Stadium, Malé, Maldives	Seychelles	2-1	2-1	Friendly	

== Honours ==
Maldives

- SAFF Championship: 2008

Preceded by Ali Ashfaq	Haveeru Maldivian Footballer of the Year; 2005	Succeeded by Ali Umar
Preceded by Ali Ashfaq	Haveeru Ranboot; 2006	Succeeded by himself
Preceded by [First Time]	FAM Maldivian Footballer of the Year; 2005	Succeeded by Ali Umar
