= Assad Abdul Ghanee =

Maldivian footballer

Personal information
- Full name: Assad Abdul Ghanee
- Date of birth: 2 January 1976 (age 50)
- Place of birth: Maldives
- Position: Defender

Senior career*
Years	Team	Apps	(Gls)
2001–2006	Club Valencia		
2007–2008	New Radiant		
2009–2011	Club Valencia	47	(9)
2012	Club Eagles	19	(4)
2013	Club Valencia	19	(2)
2014	Club Eagles	9	(0)

International career^{‡}
2001–2013	Maldives	90	(2)

Managerial career
- 2015: Maldives (Assistant coach)
- 2020: JJ Sports Club
- * Club domestic league appearances and goals as of 21 October 2014 ‡ National team caps and goals as of 14 February 2013

Assad Abdul Ghanee (born 2 January 1976) is a Maldivian international footballer.

== Career ==
Ghanee made his international debut in 2001, and he has appeared in FIFA World Cup qualifying matches.

He officially retired from the national team, on 14 February 2013 with the team mate Ahmed Thariq, after the friendly match played between Pakistan at Rasmee Dhandu Stadium. He was awarded with a "golden plaque" by Football Association of Maldives as recognition of his contribution to the national team.

== Honours ==
Maldives

- SAFF Championship: 2008
