= Ibrahim Shiyam =

Maldivian footballer

Personal information
- Full name: Ibrahim Shiyam
- Position: Midfielder

Senior career*
Years	Team	Apps	(Gls)
- Victory Sports Club
- Island FC
- Club Valencia
2010–2011	New Radiant Sports Club		
2012	VB Sports Club	0	
2012–	Maziya S&RC		
- * Club domestic league appearances and goals

Ibrahim Shiyam, also known as Dhona and Kuda Thoddoo, is a Maldivian footballer. He played for Victory Sports Club, Island FC, Club Valencia, New Radiant Sports Club and Maziya S&RC. Haveeru Daily included him among five contenders for its footballer of the year award in 2002.

== Club career ==
=== Victory and other clubs ===
Shiyam played for Victory Sports Club early in his senior career. In a November 2002 profile, Haveeru Daily reported that he was among five players competing for its footballer of the year award. The newspaper also credited him with a substantial contribution to Victory's successes that season.

He subsequently played for Island FC and Club Valencia. By 2010, he had joined New Radiant Sports Club, where he spent two seasons.

=== VB Sports Club and Maziya ===
In January 2012, Haveeru reported that Shiyam had moved from New Radiant to VB Sports Club. The newspaper described him as a midfielder and noted that he had previously played for Victory, Island FC and Valencia.

In March 2012, Haveeru reported that Shiyam had obtained a release from VB without playing a match for the club and had signed with Maziya S&RC. According to the report, VB's manager said the club granted the release after both Shiyam and Maziya requested it.

== International career ==
Shiyam was given an opportunity with the Maldives national team ahead of the 2011 SAFF Championship but did not participate in the tournament because of an injury, according to Haveeru.

== Personal life ==
Shiyam is the younger brother of Maldivian footballer Mohamed Nizam.
