= United Victory =

Maldivian football club

- Full name: United Victory
- Founded: 18 November 1973; 52 years ago
- Ground: National Football Stadium, Malé
- Capacity: 11,850
- President: Ismail Shafeeu
- Head coach: Mohamed Nazeeh
- League: Dhivehi Premier League
- 2025–26: Dhivehi Premier League, 10th of 10 (relegated)
Home colours	Away colours	Third colours

United Victory, commonly known as UV, is a Maldivian professional football club based in Malé, Maldives. Founded in 1973, the club is one of the oldest active football institutions in the country. It was originally established as a recruitment and development team by the founders of Victory Sports Club before evolving into an independently managed club.

United Victory has competed in Dhivehi Premier League since earning promotion in 2015 after crowning the 2015 Second Division Football Tournament, before being relegated in 2026.

== History ==
=== Foundation and early years ===
United Victory was founded in 1973 as a developmental team associated with Victory Sports Club. During its early years, the club functioned as a feeder side intended to provide playing opportunities and development pathways for emerging footballers. Over time, the club established its own administrative and technical structure while remaining historically linked to its founding institution.

For much of its early history, United Victory competed in the lower divisions of Maldivian football.

=== 2015 Second Division championship ===
In 2015, United Victory won the Second Division under head coach Mohamed Nazeeh. That season followed regulatory changes introduced by the Football Association of Maldives, under which the Second Division champion received automatic promotion to the top division without a playoff. United Victory became the first club to gain promotion under this revised system.

=== 2016 Premier League season ===
United Victory made its top-flight debut in the 2016 Dhivehi Premier League season. After promotion, Mohamed Nazeeh departed to coach Victory Sports Club, and Mohamed Athif was appointed head coach.

In its first Premier League campaign, United Victory finished fourth in the league standings.

The club qualified for the President's Cup, reaching the semi-finals before being eliminated by Club Eagles. United Victory also reached the semi-finals of the FA Cup, defeating league champions Maziya in the quarter-finals before losing to eventual champions Club Valencia. The club later lost the third-place playoff to New Radiant.

=== League restructuring and subsequent seasons (2017–2018) ===
In 2017, structural reforms required first-division clubs to compete in the Malé League as a qualification phase for the Premier League. United Victory recorded one win in fourteen matches and finished at the bottom of the standings. Mohamed Athif resigned during the season, and Mohamed Nazeeh returned to oversee the remainder of the campaign.

Despite finishing bottom, United Victory retained first-division status after second-division finalists withdrew from the qualification playoffs.

In 2018, the club again faced relegation pressure after finishing seventh in the Male’ League. United Victory entered a relegation playoff against Club Valencia and secured survival with a 4–2 aggregate victory.

=== Consolidation period (2019–2023) ===
Further restructuring discontinued the Male’ League, restoring the Dhivehi Premier League as the sole top-tier competition. During this period, United Victory experienced several managerial changes, including the appointments of Mohamed Nazeeh, Mohamed Adam, and Ihsan Abdul Ghanee.

United Victory started 2019–20 season with coach Mohamed Nazeeh. Upon his resignation after 11 games, Mohamed Adam was appointed as his replacement. The club finished seventh in that season.

At the start of 2020–21 season, coach Mohamed Adam received assistance from Ihsan Abdul Ghanee to prepare the team for the new season. Mohamed Adam resigned from his post during mid-season, so they appointed Ihsan Abdul Ghanee as their head coach for the remainder of the campaign. United Victory finished at the bottom of the league table; however, no relegation was implemented that season. Under Ihsan Abdul Ghanee, the club finished sixth in 2022.

In 2023, United Victory did not participate in the President’s Cup due to financial and licensing issues. That season, under head coach Ahmed Shakir, the club again finished sixth in the league. The senior squad consisted exclusively of domestic players, including several promoted from the club’s youth system.

=== 2025–26 relegation ===
For the 2025–26 season, Mohamed Nazeeh returned as head coach. United Victory finished bottom of Dhivehi Premier League and was relegated from the top division.

== Stadium ==
United Victory plays its home matches at the National Football Stadium in Malé, Maldives. The stadium has an approximate capacity of 11,850 spectators and hosts domestic league and cup competitions.

== Colours and identity ==
United Victory’s primary colour is pink, which is featured prominently in its home kits. Yellow and black are used as secondary colours in alternate kits and official branding.

== Youth development ==
The club operates academy teams that participate in Football Association of Maldives youth competitions across multiple age groups. In recent seasons, academy graduates have formed a significant portion of the senior squad.

== Current squad ==
As of 18 January 2022

Note: Flags indicate national team as defined under FIFA eligibility rules; some limited exceptions apply. Players may hold more than one non-FIFA nationality.

No.	Pos.	Nation	Player
1	GK	MDV	Ali Shaiban
2	DF	MDV	Mohamed Razaan Ibrahim
3	DF	MDV	Shifan Hassan
4	FW	MDV	Musannif Mohamed
7	FW	MDV	Ali Haisam
10	MF	MDV	Ahmed Samaah
11	FE	MDV	Ahmed Bassam Mohamed Naeem
12	MF	MDV	Naavy Mohamed
13	MF	MDV	Abdulla Amin Ali
14	DF	MDV	Adil Abdul Rahman

No.	Pos.	Nation	Player
19	FW	MDV	Areen Abdulla Ibrahim
22	DF	MDV	Moosa Azeem Hassan
23	MF	MDV	Ali Hamdhaan
25	GK	MDV	Tholaal Hassan
27	FW	MDV	Mohamed Reehaan
28	GK	MDV	Ahmed Anaf Zariyand
29	DF	MDV	Adam Nuhad
30	DF	MDV	Mohamed Zain Shujau
35	FW	MDV	Ibrahim Ilan Ismail
57	FW	CMR	Mohamed Idrissou

== Honours ==
=== Domestic ===
Second Division

- Winners: 2015
