= Vyansa =

Maldivian football club

- Full name: Villingili Youth and Sports Association
- Nickname(s): VYANSA
- Founded: 2 April 2002; 22 years ago
- Ground: Villingili
- Chairman: (Maldives) Muhammad Visham
- Manager: Badhiu
- League: Dhiraagu Dhivehi League
- 2011: 8th
Home colours

Villingili Youth and Sports Association (VYANSA) is a Maldivian sports club best known for its football team. The club is based in Villingili, currently playing in the top division.
