= Victory Sports Club =

Maldivian multi-sports club

Victory
- Full name: Victory Sports Club
- Nickname: The Mighty Reds
- Founded: 3 July 1971; 55 years ago
- Ground: Galolhu Stadium, Maldives
- Capacity: 11,850
- Chairman: Mohamed Ismail

Victory Sports Club is a Maldivian sports club based in Malé, founded 3 July 1971. They are known for one of the most successful football clubs in Maldives, winning a record 21 national championships. They have also won the Dhivehi Premier League twice, and the national cup four times.

== Achievements ==
=== Domestic competitions ===
- Maldives FA Cup: 4

(1993, 2000, 2009, 2010)

- Dhivehi League: 2

(2001, 2007)

- Male' League: 2 (2001, 2006)
- Maldives Cup Winners' Cup: 3 (2001, 2002, 2006)
- POMIS Cup: 1 (1999)

=== Youth team ===
- FAM Youth Championship: 1 (2012)

== Doubles, trebles, and hat-tricks ==
- Doubles
  - National Championship, Cup Winners' Cup: 3 (2001, 2002, 2006)
  - National Championship, Male' League: 3 (2001, 2003, 2006)
  - National Championship, FA Cup: 2 (2000, 2009)
  - Male' League, Cup Winners' Cup: 2 (2001, 2006)
  - National Championship, Dhivehi League: 1 (2000)
  - National Championship, Super Cup: 1 (2006)
  - Dhivehi League, FA Cup: 1 (2000)
  - Cup Winners' Cup, Super Cup: 1 (2006)
  - Male' League, Super Cup: 1 (2006)
- Trebles
  - National Championship, Dhivehi League, FA Cup: 1 (2000)
  - National Championship, Male' League, Cup Winners' Cup: 1 (2001)
- Hat-tricks
  - National Championship: 2 times (1983, 1984, 1985) and (2000, 2001, 2002)

== Performance in AFC competitions ==
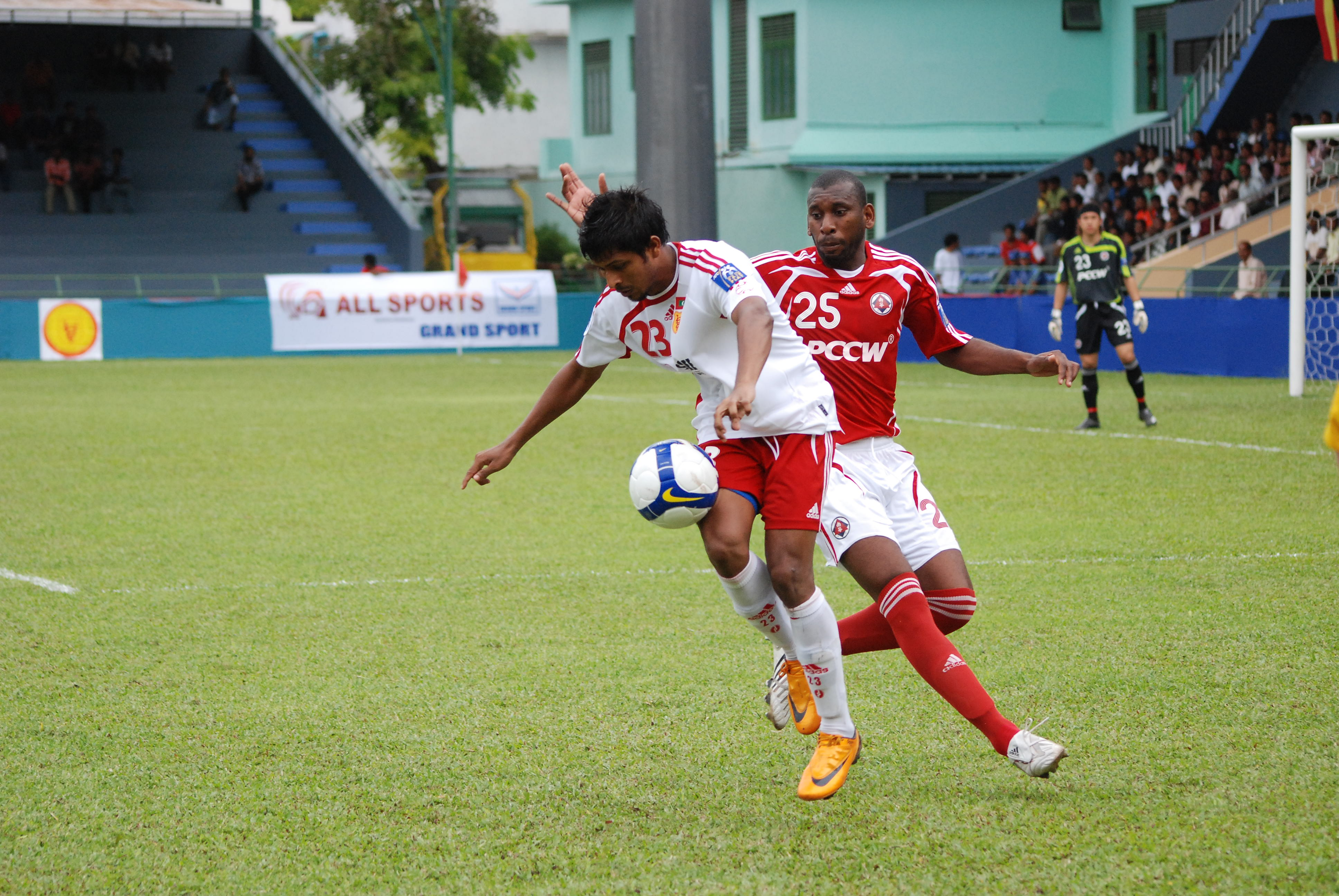
Victory SC player (in white) in action against South China AA during the 2008 AFC Cup match at the Maldives National Stadium.

- Asian Club Championship: 5 appearances

1987: Qualifying stage
1988: Qualifying stage
1990: Qualifying stage
1994: Group stage
1998: Second round

- AFC Cup: 4 appearances

2007: Group stage
2008: Group stage
2010: Group stage
2011: Group stage
2012: Qualifying play-off

- AFC Cup Winners Cup: 1 appearance

2001–02: Second round
