= VB Addu FC =

VB Addu
- Full name: VB Addu Football Club
- Nickname: The Islanders
- Founded: 1987; 39 years ago (as Orchid Sports Club)
- Ground: Galolhu National Stadium
- Capacity: 11,850
- League: Third Division
Home colours	Away colours

VB Addu FC is a Maldivian professional football club based in Malé. VB Addu is the former VB Sports Club. The club was earlier known as Orchid Sports Club, New Lagoons, and Island Football Club.

== History ==
The club was founded in 1987. The club originally evolved from Orchid Sports Club, a team which was formed by the staff of Bandos Island Resort. Orchid was later bought by the owners of Club Lagoons, which later was undertaken by a group of businessmen from Addu Atoll and renamed to Island Football Club. The team was changed to VB Sports Club in 2006.

== Performance in AFC competitions ==
- AFC Cup: 5 appearances

2004: Group stage
2009: Group stage
2010: Group Stage
2011: Group stage
2012: Group stage

== Honors ==
- Dhivehi League: 3
  - 2009, 2010, 2011
- Maldives FA Cup: 4
  - 2002, 2003, 2008, 2011
- Charity Shield: 3
  - 2010, 2011, 2012
- Male' League: 1
  - 2002
- President's Cup: 1
  - 2010
