= 2014 New Radiant S.C. season =

New Radiant
- Chairman: Ali Waheed
- Head Coach: Ángel Pérez García (25 November 2013 – 4 March 2014) Ismail Anil (caretaker coach until 12 March 2014) Simon McMenemy (13 March 2014 – 10 May 2014) Ismail Anil (10 June 2014 – 6 August 2014) Mika Lönnström (since 6 August 2014)
- Stadium: National Football Stadium
- Dhivehi League: Winners
- FA Cup: Runners-up
- President's Cup: Winners
- AFC Cup: Group stage
- FA Charity Shield: Winners
- Top goalscorer: League: Ali Fasir (19 goals); All: Ali Fasir (23 goals)
Home colours	Away colours

The 2014 season is New Radiant Sports Club's 35th year in existence as a football club. New Radiant also participate in the AFC Cup this season, qualifying directly for the group stage by finishing first in the 2013 Dhivehi League.

== Background ==
New Radiant finished as champions of last year's in the Dhivehi League, FA Cup, President's Cup and Charity Shield with a quadruple and 100% winning record. So they will be participating in the 2014 AFC Cup directly from the group stage. Ángel Pérez García was announced as the new head coach on 25 November 2013 and later on 4 March 2014 the agreement was terminated on mutual consent. Assistant coach Ismail Anil acted as the caretaker coach following the departure of coach García until the arrival of coach Simon McMenemy. Simon was at the job from 13 March 2014 to 10 May 2014. Before the local season began, club appointed the assistant coach Ismail Anil as the head coach on 10 June 2014. On 6 August 2014, New Radiant assigned Mika Lönnström as the new head coach for the club and Ismail Anil continued as the assistant manager.

Ismail Wisham was appointed as the club manager and Ibrahim Ibthisham as the club's Director of Administration. Ibthishaam was the club manager during the 2013 season. Ismail Anil was named as the assistant coach of the club on 12 February 2014.

Three foreign players Kingsley Chukwudi Nkurumeh, Mansa Sylla and Yusif Nurudeen were released by the club as their contract duration were over. New Radiant accepted the transfer request for Moosa Yaamin from the rival side Maziya on 30 December 2013.

Mohamed Umair, Ali Fasir, Ahmed Abdulla, Ahmed Niyaz, Imran Mohamed renewed their contract after the end of 2013 season.

Mukhthar Naseer, Ibrahim Fazeel, Shafiu Ahmed, Hamza Mohamed, Shamweel Qasim and Mohamed Rasheed were the local signings by the club for the 2014 football season.

Evans Mensah, Jonathan Quartey, were the foreign signings for the 2014 season. But Evans Mensah was released by the club, along with Ismail Easa on 16 February 2014 and Jonathan Quartey was also released by the club after the 2014 AFC Cup group stage.

Blues also signed a Brazilian striker Joelton Jonathan Sampaio but later terminated the contract due to a serious injury in a life-threatening car accident and was required to undergo several surgeries. So the agreement was terminated on mutual understanding between his agent and the club.

Before the local football season started, New Radiant signed three foreign players, David Carmona, Jamal Dibi and Dane Milovanović but on 10 August 2014, Dibi was released by the club on mutual understandings.

== Club ==
=== Coaching staff ===
- Manager: (Maldives) Ismail Wisham
- Head coach: (Finland) Mika Lönnström
- Assistant coach: (Maldives) Ismail Anil
- Kit Manager: (Maldives) Abdul Sattar Ahmed
- Official: (Maldives) Hussain Abdulla
- Official: (Maldives) Ahmed Rasheed
- Official: (Maldives) Ibrahim Shareef

=== Other information ===
- Chairman: (Maldives) Ali Waheed
- Vice Chairman: (Maldives) Hassan Shujau
- Director of Football: (Maldives) Anwar Ali
- Director of Administrations: (Maldives) Ibrahim Ibthisham
- Board Director: (Maldives) Aishath Leesha
- Board Director: (Maldives) Adheel Ismail
- Board Director: (Maldives) Ahmed Zareer
- Board Director: (Maldives) Adam Ziyad
- Board Director: (Maldives) Ali Shareef
- Board Director: (Maldives) Ahmed Rameez
- Board Director: (Maldives) Mohamed Shafeeq

== Kit ==
Supplier: Sports Power / Sponsor: Milo

New Radianst kits for the 2014 season were unveiled during the New Radiant night on 11 January 2014. Kits were supplied by the local brand Sports Power.

On 15 January 2014, New Radiant signed with two co-sponsors; with Tropic Investments Private Limited to market their brand Maldives Shipyard and the other with Timber House.

Home	Away	Goalkeeper

== Pre-season ==
New Radiant preceded their 2014 campaign with the 2014 Milo Tour to Hinnavaru and played against Naifaru, Kuredu Resort and Hinnavaru.

Date	Opponents	Result F–A	Scorers
3 February 2014	Naifaru	4–0	Umair (2), Fazeel (2)
5 February 2014	Kuredu Resort	9–0	Umair (2), Fasir (2), Mensah (2), Easa, Abdulla, Fazel
7 February 2014	Hinnavaru	8–1	Mensah (2), Umair (2), Fasir (3), Mukhthar
11 February 2014	(Seychelles) Northern Dynamo	1–3	Fasir 76'

== Competitions ==
=== Overall ===
Competition	Started round	Final position / round	First match	Last match
AFC Cup	Group stage	Group stage	25 February 2015	23 April 2014
FA Charity Shield	Final	Winner	10 June 2014	
Dhivehi League	—	Winner	16 June 2014	9 November 2014
FA Cup	Quarter-finals	Runners-up	14 October 2014	19 November 2014
President's Cup	Semi final 1	Winner	23 November 2014	30 November 2014

=== Competition record ===
Competition	Record							
Competition	G	W	D*	L	GF	GA	GD	Win %
AFC Cup	6	1	0	5	2	12	−10	16.67
FA Charity Shield	1	1	0	0	3	1	+2	100.00
Dhivehi League	19	17	1	1	57	8	+49	89.47
FA Cup	3	2	1	0	7	3	+4	66.67
President's Cup	2	2	0	0	3	1	+2	100.00
Total	31	23	2	6	72	25	+47	74.19

*Draws include knockout matches decided on penalty kicks.

=== AFC Cup ===
==== Group stage ====
Team	Pld	W	D	L	GF	GA	GD	Pts	PSJ	CHB	HOM	NRA
(Indonesia) Persipura Jayapura	6	3	2	1	9	4	+5	11		2–0	0–2	3–0
(India) Churchill Brothers	6	3	1	2	10	7	+3	10 (Note: Tiebreakers: Churchill Brothers and Home United are ranked on head-to-head record.)	1–1		3–1	3–0
(Singapore) Home United	6	3	1	2	8	6	+2	10	1–1	2–1		2–0
(Maldives) New Radiant	6	1	0	5	2	12	−10	3	0–2	1–2	1–0	

Notes:

Date	Opponents	H / A	Result F–A	Scorers	Attendance
25 February 2014	Home United	H	1–0	Umair 53' (pen.)	5,200
11 March 2014	Churchill Brothers	A	0–3		1,500
18 March 2014	Persipura Jayapura	A	0–3		9,866
2 April 2014	Persipura Jayapura	H	0–2		2,400
9 April 2014	Home United	A	0–2		1,348
23 April 2014	Churchill Brothers	H	1–2	Umair 40'	1,500

=== FA Charity Shield ===
Date	Opponents	Result F–A	Scorers
10 June 2014	Maziya	3–1	Shamweel (2) 28', 40', Fasir 59'

=== Dhivehi League ===
==== League table ====
Pos	Team	Pld	W	D	L	GF	GA	GD	Pts	Qualification or relegation
1	New Radiant SC	19	17	1	1	57	8	+49	52	2015 AFC Cup group stage
2	Maziya S&RC	19	14	3	2	61	19	+42	45	2015 AFC Cup Play-off
3	Club Eagles	19	11	2	6	40	22	+18	35	
4	Victory Sports Club	19	8	2	9	30	33	-3	23	
5	Club Valencia	19	4	5	10	15	33	-18	17	

Rules for classification: 1) points; 2) goal difference; 3) number of goals scored.

==== Matches ====
Date	Round	Opponents	Result F–A	Scorers	League position
16 June 2014	1	Club AYL	7–0	David (2) 9', 28', Umair (2) 11', 84' (pen.), Fasir 47', Milovanović 72', Abdulla 90+2'	1st
23 June 2014	1	Victory	3–0	Fazeel 14', Dibi 57', Hamza 90+1'	1st
7 July 2014	1	Mahibadhoo	4–0	Fazeel 14', Fasir (2) 55', 84', Rasheed 65'	1st
14 July 2014	1	Eagles	4–1	Milovanović 6' (pen.), Fasir (2) 47', 89', Fazeel 79'	1st
20 July 2014	1	Valencia	3–0	Umair 39', Fasir 75', Shamweel 86'	1st
28 July 2014	1	BG Sports	6–0	Dibi 12', 78', Fasir (3) 15', 67', 82' (pen.), Shamweel 87'	1st
3 August 2014	1	Maziya	0–1		2nd
7 August 2014	2	Maziya	1–0	Milovanović 31' (pen.)	1st
11 August 2014	2	Eagles	2–0	David 11', Umair 32'	1st
15 August 2014	2	Victory	1–0	Umair 72'	1st
21 August 2014	2	Valencia	3–1	David 30', Umair 62' (pen.), Fasir 64'	1st
26 August 2014	2	Club AYL	4–0	Milovanović 3', Ahmed 27', Umair 48', Suhail 67'	1st
30 September 2014	2	BG Sports	5–1	David 35', Umair 45', Fasir (2) 70', 90+3' (pen.), Milovanović 80'	1st
9 October 2014	2	Mahibadhoo	3–1	Fazeel 19', Akram 47', David 75'	1st
22 October 2014	3	Valencia	2–1	Hamza 82', Fasir 90+4'	1st
26 October 2014	3	Victory	1–0	Fasir 12'	1st
1 November 2014	3	Eagles	1–0	Akram 11'	1st
5 November 2014	3	Mahibadhoo	6–1	Fasir (5) 6', 21', 30', 65', 69' (pen.), David 14'	1st
9 November 2014	3	Maziya	1–1	Shifan 15'	1st

=== FA Cup ===
Date	Round	Opponents	Result F–A	Scorers
14 October 2014	Quarter-finals	Mahibadhoo	6–3	Fasir (2) 20', 33', David (2) 49', 52', Akram 50', Fazeel 68'
14 November 2014	Semi-finals	Eagles	1–0	Umair 70'
19 November 2014	Final	Maziya	0–0 (aet) (3–4p)	

=== President's Cup ===
Date	Round	Opponents	Result F–A	Scorers
23 November 2014	Semi final 1	Maziya	2–1	David 14', Hamza 22'
30 November 2014	Final	Eagles	1–0 (aet)	Fasir 106'
