= 2015 Maldivian FA Charity Shield =

New Radiant	Maziya
0	2
- Date: 6 April 2015
- Venue: National Football Stadium, Malé
- Man of the Match: Pablo Rodríguez (Maziya)
- Weather: Mostly Cloudy; 29 °C (84 °F)

The 2015 Maldivian FA Charity Shield, (commonly known as the 2015 Milo Charity Shield due to sponsorship reasons) was the 7th Maldivian FA Charity Shield, an annual Maldivian football match played between the winners of the previous season's Dhivehi League and FA Cup. The game was played between New Radiant, champions of the 2014 Dhivehi League, and Maziya, champions of 2014 Maldives FA Cup.

Maziya began the game more strongly and took the lead when Pablo Rodríguez scored in the 34th minute. They scored their second of the match, as substitute Ahmed Nashid finished off a counter-attacking move.

Maziya's victory was their first ever victory in a Charity Shield match and their coach Ali Suzain described the win as a way for another success.

== Background ==
Introduced in 2009 after the Cup Winners Cup was abolished, the Maldivian FA Charity Shield began as a contest between the champions of the Dhivehi League and Maldives FA Cup. As the Dhivehi League was re-branded to Dhivehi Premier League in 2015, the champion of the Premier League will play against the FA Cup champions from the 2015 season onwards. As part of a sponsorship deal between Milo, the match was officially referred to as the Milo Charity Shield for the first five years and later Lifebouy came up with the sponsorship and the match was officially referred as "Lifebuoy Charity Shield" in 2014. Again from 2015, it continues as the "Milo Charity Shield".

New Radiant qualified for the 2015 Maldivian FA Charity Shield as winners of the 2014 Dhivehi League. The club won their fourth league title (third consecutive title in a row). The other Charity Shield place went to Maziya, who were the champions of 2014 Maldives FA Cup. It was their second FA Cup title.

New Radiant and Maziya both made two appearances before the 2015 Charity Shield match, when they both met in the 2013 Charity Shield match and in 2014 Charity Shield match; where New Radiant won 3–1 on both occasions.

The match was televised live in the Maldives on Television Maldives.

== Build-up ==
As The winner of this match has to donate their MVR 50,000 cash prize to a non-governmental organization of the Maldives, New Radiant decided to donate to the Tiny Hearts of Maldives and Maziya to the Maldives Autism Association.

New Radiant coach Amir Alagic, said before the game that, "It is a 50 – 50 match and there might be a difference of an individual player to win the match. And also it might win due to a decision by the referee." He was conscious of his team's poor start at the 2015 POMIS Cup and the 2015 AFC Cup, and wanted them to do better. He also said that the result doesn't matter to him, and he wants to see where his players are, and how much his players have improved after his arrival.

On the other hand, Maziya coach Ali Suzain targets for a win. He said before the game that winning the Shield "it would be very good start for Maziya to start the season." Suzain expected his opponents to provide a good test for Maziya in the Shield match and thereafter in the league season.

== Match ==
=== Team selection ===
New Radiant were predicted to line-up in a 4–2–3–1 formation, with Hamza Mohamed and Viliam Macko as wide men. Winger Ali Fasir was unavailable for selection because he was not fully recovered after his surgery. Maziya were expected to line up 4–2–1–3, unlike New Radiant, with Mohamed Irufaan and Moosa Yaamin as a holding midfielders, as Toshiya Hosoe was unavailable due to severe common cold and fever.

When the team sheets were revealed, New Radiant lined up in a 4–3–2–1 surprisingly including Ibrahim Fazeel in their defensive midfield, as his first appearance of the season. Hamza was benched and they started Rilwan Waheed at his right wing position while Rilwan's right back position was filled by Ahmed Abdulla. Unlike it was predicted, Maziya lined up with two strikers, in a 4–1–3–2 formation. Hussain Niyaz Mohamed and Mohamed Umair were played as wings, while Asadhulla Abdulla played behind Pablo Rodríguez in the forward.

=== Summary ===
==== First half ====
Maziya got the match underway and tried to create good chances too score. In the 11th minute, Shafiu Ahmed was shown the game's first yellow card for fouling Asadhulla. In the 21st minute, Hussain Niyaz's shot inside the penalty area was deflected out by the cross-bar, while his shot from the same position, after a couple of minutes was punched out by the keeper Alisher Akhmedov. After a minute, Asadhulla received a yellow card for his foul on Alisher when he lost position to the New Radiant goalkeeper. New Radiant were forced to make an early substitution in the 26th minute of the first half, as Ibrahim Fazeel left the field to the bench due to an unknown reason and Akram Abdul Ghanee came in to play. New Radiant goalkeeper trainer Hassan Hameed was sent off from the bench for throwing frustrations towards the referee, in the 27th minute. In the 31st minute, Rilwan was shown a yellow card for a foul on Samdhooh Mohamed inside the Maziya penalty area. Pablo Rodríguez took the lead for Maziya in the 34th minute. Samdhooh's free-kick from the left flank was headed by Asadhulla and was blocked by a New Radiant defender. Rodríguez got the rebounded ball and scored the goal.

==== Second half ====
New Radiant ended the first half with zero shots, and made a half time substitution, bringing midfielder Mohamed Shaffaz in to play for the defender Shafiu. New Radiant played a better possession game, trying to make chances in this half, but Maziya had the first shot of the second half, after just five minutes. Samdhooh's corner was side-netted by Amdham Ali with his head. New radiant made their final substitution with 21 minutes remaining for full-time; Ahmed Suhail replacing Rilwan. Zhivko was shown a yellow card in the 71st minute, for a foul on Shaffaz. Maziya made their first substitute in the 72nd minute, bringing in Ahmed Nashid for Hussain Niyaz. They made their second substitution after three minute, replacing Ahmed Imaz for Mohamed Umair. In the 77th minute, New Radiant's Suhail tried to dribble into the penalty area from Ashad Ali's through ball but Samdhooh Mohamed fouled him on the edge of the penalty area and received a yellow card. Maziya made their final substitution in the 86th minute, Hassan Shifaz replacing captain Asadhulla Addulla. Asadhulla handed over the captain band for Samdhooh before coming off. During the 2nd minute of the stoppage time, substitute Nashid doubled the lead for Maziya. While New Radiant goalkeeper Alisher was inside Maziya's penalty area for a corner kick, Rodríguez got the ball and he dribbled off his marker while Alisher tried hard to take his position, and when Alisher was back to his position, Rodríguez passed the ball to the unmarked Nashid and he sent the ball into an empty net. While Nashid took his shot, Mohamed Rasheed was on the goal line to block it but he could not head away Nashid's shot which hit the roof of the net. Nashid also received a yellow for his goal celebration, by taking his shirt off. New Radiant's captain Ashad was also shown a yellow card in the final minute of the stoppage time.

=== Details ===
6 April 2015
21:00 UTC+05:00

New Radiant	0–2	Maziya
	Report	34' Rodríguez; 90+2' Nashid

National Football Stadium, Malé

New Radiant	Maziya

GK	1	(Uzbekistan) Alisher Akhmedov
RB	4	(Maldives) Ahmed Abdulla
CB	3	(Maldives) Mohamed Sifan
CB	26	(Maldives) Shafiu Ahmed	(yellow card) 12'	(substituted off) 46'
LB	19	(Maldives) Mohamed Rasheed
DM	5	(Maldives) Ibrahim Fazeel		(substituted off) 26'
CM	11	(Slovakia) Viliam Macko
CM	23	(Maldives) Ahmed Niyaz
RM	8	(Maldives) Rilwan Waheed	(yellow card) 32'	(substituted off) 69'
LM	9	(Maldives) Ashad Ali (c)	(yellow card) 90+4'
CF	10	(England) David Moli
Substitutes:
MF	13	(Maldives) Akram Abdul Ghanee	(yellow card) 76'	(substituted on) 26'
MF	6	(Maldives) Mohamed Shaffaz		(substituted on) 46'
FW	16	(Maldives) Ahmed Suhail		(substituted on) 69'
Coach:
(Bosnia and Herzegovina) Amir Alagic

GK	25	(Maldives) Imran Mohamed
RB	8	(Maldives) Faruhad Ismail
CB	18	(Bulgaria) Zhivko Dinev	(yellow card) 71'
CB	4	(Maldives) Amdhan Ali
LB	13	(Maldives) Samdhooh Mohamed	(yellow card) 77'
DM	23	(Maldives) Moosa Yaamin
CM	5	(Maldives) Mohamed Irufaan
RM	16	(Maldives) Hussain Niyaz Mohamed		(substituted off) 72'
LM	12	(Maldives) Mohamed Umair		(substituted off) 75'
SS	10	(Maldives) Asadhulla Abdulla (c)	(yellow card) 25'	(substituted off) 86'
CF	15	(Spain) Pablo Rodríguez	34'
Substitutes:
FW	11	(Maldives) Ahmed Nashid	(90+2)	(yellow card) 90+3'	(substituted on) 72'
FW	7	(Maldives) Ahmed Imaaz		(substituted on) 75'
DF	22	(Maldives) Hassan Shifaz		(substituted on) 86'
Coach:
(Maldives) Ali Suzain

Man of the match

- Pablo Rodríguez (Maziya)

Match rules

- 90 minutes.
- Penalty shoot-out if scores still level.
- Maximum of three substitutions.

=== Statistics ===
Statistic	New Radiant	Maziya
Goals scored	0	2
Shots on target	0	4
Shots off target	6	7
Corner kicks	5	3
Fouls	22	21
Offsides	1	1
Yellow cards	4	4
Red cards	0	0

== Post-match ==
The shield was presented to Asadhulla by Minister of Youth and Sports Mohamed Maleeh Jamal. Maziya's win marked their first victory in the Community Shield. Chairman of Maziya Ahmed Sajid presented the donation of MVR 50,000 from their cash prize to the Maldives Autism Association. Suzain was delighted with his team’s performance and described their play in the first half as complete. He described the win as significant because it gave Maziya a confidence boost going into the season. "This is Maziya's first ever Charity Shield win, they can never win it again for the first time. So we've got the chance to think about other competitions. It would be a great achievement if Maziya could win the domestic tournaments which we have not won yet, in this time when the team is in a good maturing phase. Winning this Shield match was very important", Suzain said after the match. Maziya captain Asadhulla described the win as, "the secret behind the success was our team work".

== See also ==
- 2014 Dhivehi League
- 2014 Maldives FA Cup
