= 2013 President's Cup (Maldives) final =

2013 President's Cup final
- Event: 2013 President's Cup
New Radiant	Maziya
4	2
- After extra time
- Date: 23 October 2013
- Venue: Rasmee Dhandu Stadium, Malé

The 2013 President's Cup (Maldives) final was the 63rd Final of the Maldives President's Cup.

== Route to the final ==
New Radiant
1st Semi	New Radiant	3–1	Maziya

Maziya
1st Semi	New Radiant	3–1	Maziya
3rd semi	Maziya	2–1	BG Sports Club

== Match ==
=== Details ===
23 October 2013
21:15 UTC+5

New Radiant	4–2 (a.e.t.)	Maziya
Umair 5' (pen.), 65'; Ashfaq 107'; H. Niyaz 119'	Report	30' Assadhulla; 71' Rumen

Rasmee Dhandu Stadium, Malé

New Radiant	Maziya

GK	25	(Maldives) Imran Mohamed (c)
RB	8	(Maldives) Rilwan Waheed	(yellow card) 56'	(substituted off) 61'
CB	2	(Nigeria) Kingsley Chukwudi Nkurumeh
CB	3	(Maldives) Mohamed Shifan	(yellow card) 67'
LB	4	(Maldives) Ahmed Abdulla		Substituted off
DM	23	(Maldives) Ahmed Niyaz		(substituted off) 68'
CM	11	(Guinea) Sylla Mansa
AM	13	(Maldives) Akram Abdul Ghanee
SS	37	(Maldives) Mohammad Umair
SS	5	(Maldives) Ali Fasir
CF	7	(Maldives) Ali Ashfaq
Substitutes:
DF	6	(Ghana) Yusif Nurudeen	(yellow card) 85'	(substituted in) 61'
MF	16	(Maldives) Hussain Niyaz Mohamed	Booked	(substituted in) 68'
FW	10	(Maldives) Ali Umar	Booked	Substituted in
Manager:
(Maldives) Mohamed Iqbal (Caretaker) (Maldives) Mohamed Nizam (Caretaker)

GK	25	(Maldives) Mohamed Imran	(yellow card) 4'
LB	19	(Maldives) Mohamed Rasheed
CB	20	(Maldives) Ali Imran		Substituted off
CB	17	(Maldives) Shafiu Ahmed
RB	18	(Bulgaria) Zhivko Dinev
CM	14	(Maldives) Ahmed Mohamed (c)	(yellow card) 33'
CM	6	(Maldives) Mohamed Arif
AM	29	(Bulgaria) Rumen Georgiev Aleksandrov
LF	7	(Maldives) Ibrahim Shiyam
RF	5	(Maldives) Ahmed Nashid		(substituted off) 64'
CF	32	(Maldives) Assadhulla Abdulla		Substituted off
Substitutes:
FW	21	(Maldives) Mukhthar Naseer	Booked	(substituted in) 64'
FW	12	(Maldives) Ahmed Rasheed		Substituted in
DF	33	(Maldives) Samdhooh Mohamed		Substituted in
Manager:
(Maldives) Ismail Mahfooz

Match rules

- 90 minutes.
- 30 minutes of extra-time if necessary.
- Penalty shoot-out if scores still level.
- Maximum of three substitutions.

== See also ==
- 2013 President's Cup (Maldives)
