= 2013 New Radiant S.C. season =

New Radiant
- Chairman: Ali Waheed
- Head Coach: Velizar Popov (Until 7 October 2013) Mohamed Iqbal; Mohamed Nizam (Caretaker coaches)
- Stadium: Rasmee Dhandu Stadium
- Dhivehi League: Winners
- FA Cup: Winners
- President's Cup: Winners
- AFC Cup: Quarter finals
- FA Charity Shield: Winners
- Top goalscorer: League: Ali Ashfaq (31 goals); All: Ali Ashfaq (43 goals)
Home colours	Away colours	Third colours

The 2013 season is New Radiant Sports Club's 34th year in existence as a football club. New Radiant also participate in the AFC Cup this season, qualifying directly for the group stage by finishing first in the 2012 Dhivehi League.

== Background ==
New Radiant finished as champions of last year's Dhivehi League, President's Cup and Charity Shield without losing a single game in the league. So they will be participating in the 2013 AFC Cup directly from the group stage.

Velizar Popov was announced as the new head coach on 6 January 2013 following the resignation of Mohamed Shiyaz. Mohamed Iqbal and Mohamed Nizam were named as the assistant coaches, while Ibrahim Shaaz Habeeb as the club manager. Later during the mid season, club part company with Shaaz on mutual understandings, due to his personal responsibility and other reasons.

On 13 January 2013, New Radiant announced that Imran Mohamed will replace Ahmed Thoriq as the team captain, and Ali Ashfaq and Mohamed Umair will be the team vice-captains.

Club announced their 5 new signings at the club's Gold Night. Ali Fasir returned to the Blues after a year, with Mohamed Umair, Rilwan Waheed, Moosa Yaamin and Hussain Niyaz Mohamed.

On 27 January 2013, New Radiant announced the signing of a foreign defender Sylla Mansah.

New Radiant unveiled their new set of signings, Mohamed Jazlaan, Ibrahim Ushamath and Mohamed Shifan at their Open Day.

On 20 June 2013, New Radiant signed Akram Abdul Ghanee from Club Valencia and handed over his brother Assad Abdul Ghanee's number 13 jersey to him. 3 days later on 23 June 2013, club signed Ismail Easa from Maziya. He was given his usual 15 number jersey.

On 26 June 2013, club signed Yusif Nurudeen, a Ghana under–21 international from Medeama Sporting Club on loan until the end of this season.

During the club's mid-term congress, Hassan Shujau and Mohamed Shafeeq were named as the new vice chairman of the club. And club also announced that in honour of club supporters, New Radiant will vacant the number 12 jersey from next season.

New Radiant loaned three of their youth players; Mohamed Karam, Ali Athoof and Ibrahim Waheed Hassan to the Third division side Thoddoo FC.

== Kit ==
Supplier: MediaNet / Sponsor: Milo
State Trading Organization (STO) signed a sponsorship agreement with New Radiant on 14 February 2013. On 6 July 2013, club announced the extension of the sponsorship agreement with the main sponsor Milo to another two years.

On 31 July 2013, New Radiant signed a deal of MVR 1.4 million with Sports Power for two years (from 2014 season), with the local brand Sports Power as the club's kit provider. The current kit provider is MediaNet since 2012.

Home	Away	Third	Goalkeeper 1	Goalkeeper 2	Goalkeeper 3

== First team squad ==
As of 7 August 2013.

Squad No.	Name	Nationality	Position	Date of Birth (Age)
Goalkeepers
1	Niushad Ali	(Maldives)	GK	8 November 1980 (age 45)
18	Mohamed Jazlaan	(Maldives)	GK	12 April 1993 (age 33)
25	Imran Mohamed (captain)	(Maldives)	GK	18 December 1980 (age 45)
Defenders
2	Kingsley Chukwudi Nkurumeh	(Nigeria)	DF	19 April 1990 (age 36)
3	Mohamed Shifan	(Maldives)	DF	8 March 1983 (age 43)
4	Ahmed Abdulla	(Maldives)	DF	11 March 1987 (age 39)
6	Yusif Nurudeen (On loan from Medeama Sporting Club)	(Ghana)	DF	28 August 1992 (age 34)
8	Rilwan Waheed	(Maldives)	DF	14 February 1991 (age 35)
11	Sylla Mansah	(Guinea)	DF	22 August 1983 (age 43)
13	Akram Abdul Ghanee	(Maldives)	DF	19 March 1989 (age 37)
17	Ibrahim Ushamath	(Maldives)	DF	23 February 1992 (age 34)
19	Mohamed Ishan	(Maldives)	DF	23 March 1994 (age 32)
26	Abdulla Jailam	(Maldives)	DF	24 June 1992 (age 34)
—	Ibrahim Reehan	(Maldives)	DF	2 December 1992 (age 33)
Midfielders
5	Ali Fasir	(Maldives)	MF	4 September 1988 (age 37)
15	Ismail Easa	(Maldives)	MF	19 December 1989 (age 36)
16	Hussain Niyaz Mohamed	(Maldives)	MF	19 March 1987 (age 39)
20	Moosa Yaamin	(Maldives)	MF	29 December 1992 (age 33)
23	Ahmed Niyaz	(Maldives)	MF	17 March 1980 (age 46)
28	Hassan Muan	(Maldives)	MF	16 November 1993 (age 32)
29	Abdulla Ziham	(Maldives)	MF	11 March 1995 (age 31)
31	Ahmed Inaad	(Maldives)	MF	25 December 1991 (age 34)
37	Mohamed Umair (vice-captain)	(Maldives)	MF	3 July 1988 (age 38)
39	Ahmed Ali	(Maldives)	MF	9 August 1986 (age 40)
41	Mohamed Mazin	(Maldives)	MF	13 January 1997 (age 29)
—	Hassan Saaif	(Maldives)	MF	18 March 1996 (age 30)
Strikers
7	Ali Ashfaq (vice-captain)	(Maldives)	FW	6 September 1985 (age 40)
9	Ahmed Thoriq	(Maldives)	FW	4 October 1980 (age 45)
10	Ali Umar	(Maldives)	FW	5 August 1980 (age 46)
14	Naavy Mohamed	(Maldives)	FW	6 July 1994 (age 32)
32	Abdul Ghanee Ali	(Maldives)	FW	21 August 1986 (age 40)
36	Ibrahim Suhail	(Maldives)	FW	13 August 1994 (age 32)

== Pre-season ==
Date	Opponents	Result F–A	Scorers
18 January 2014	F. Nilandhoo	1–5	Ashfaq (2), Umair, Niyaz, Aiman

== Competitions ==
=== Overall ===
Competition	Started round	Final position / round	First match	Last match
FA Charity Shield	Final	Winner	22 February 2013	
AFC Cup	Group stage	Quarter-finals	5 March 2013	24 September 2013
Dhivehi League	—	Winner	26 February 2013	28 July 2013
FA Cup	Quarter-finals	Winner	5 August 2013	4 October 2013
President's Cup	Semi final 1	Winner	8 October 2013	23 October 2013

=== Competition record ===
Competition	Record							
Competition	G	W	D*	L	GF	GA	GD	Win %
FA Charity Shield	1	1	0	0	3	1	+2	100.00
AFC Cup	9	6	0	3	24	16	+8	66.67
Dhivehi League	19	19	0	0	73	5	+68	100.00
FA Cup	3	3	0	0	6	0	+6	100.00
President's Cup	2	2	0	0	7	3	+4	100.00
Total	34	31	0	3	113	25	+88	91.18

*Draws include knockout matches decided on penalty kicks.

=== FA Charity Shield ===
Date	Opponents	Result F–A	Scorers
22 February 2013	Maziya	3–1	Ashfaq 28' (pen.), Umair (2) 42', 55'

=== AFC Cup ===
==== Group stage ====
Team	Pld	W	D	L	GF	GA	GD	Pts	NRA	YAN	SH	PSB
(Maldives) New Radiant	6	5	0	1	20	4	+16	15		3–1	1–0	6–1
(Myanmar) Yangon United	6	5	0	1	18	5	+13	15	2–0		2–0	3–0
(Hong Kong) Sunray Cave JC Sun Hei	6	1	1	4	12	12	0	4	0–3	1–3		8–0
(Indonesia) Persibo Bojonegoro	6	0	1	5	5	34	−29	1	0–7	1–7	3–3	

New Radiant and Yangon United are tied on head-to-head record, and so are ranked by overall goal difference.

Team	Pld	W	D	L	GF	GA	GD	Pts
(Maldives) New Radiant	2	1	0	1	3	3	0	3
(Myanmar) Yangon United	2	1	0	1	3	3	0	3

Date	Opponents	H / A	Result F–A	Scorers	Attendance
5 March 2013	Sun Hei	H	1–0	Umair 67'	4,880
12 March 2013	Persibo Bojonegoro	A	7–0	Umair 11', Ashfaq (5) 34', 50', 58', 70', 80', Umar 66'	700
3 April 2013	Yangon United	A	0–2		539
9 April 2013	Yangon United	H	3–1	Umair 31', Fasir 38', Mansah 45+1'	5,400
24 April 2013	Sun Hei	A	3–0	Fasir (2) 61', 71', Umair 86'	477
1 May 2013	Persibo Bojonegoro	H	6–1	Ali Ashfaq (3) 28', 68', 81' (pen.), Umair (2) 31', 36', Umar 72'	5,400

==== Knockout phase ====
===== Round of 16 =====
Date	Opponents	H / A	Result F–A	Scorers	Attendance
15 May 2013	Selangor	H	2–0 (aet)	Niyaz 97', Fasir 105'	8,600

===== Quarter-finals =====
Date	Leg	Opponents	H / A	Result F–A	Aggregate	Scorers	Attendance
17 September 2013	First leg	Al-Kuwait	H	2–7	2–12	Fasir 55', Ashfaq 68'	8,600
24 September 2013	Second leg	Al-Kuwait	A	0–5	2–12		230

=== Dhivehi League ===
==== League table ====
Pos	Team	Pld	W	D	L	GF	GA	GD	Pts	Qualification or relegation
1	New Radiant SC (C)	19	19	0	0	73	5	+68	57	2014 AFC Cup
2	Maziya	19	12	1	6	38	18	+20	37	2014 Dhivehi League
3	BG Sports	19	7	3	9	19	23	−4	24	2014 Dhivehi League
4	All Youth Linkage	19	7	3	9	15	34	−19	24	2014 Dhivehi League
5	Club Valencia	19	6	4	9	22	29	−7	22	2014 Dhivehi League
6	Eagles	19	4	5	10	17	37	−20	17	2014 Dhivehi League
7	Victory SC	14	3	3	8	10	27	−17	12	Promotion/relegation playoff
8	VB (R)	14	2	3	9	13	34	−21	9	Promotion/relegation playoff

Updated to match(es) played on 24 June 2013. Source: RSSSF.com
Rules for classification: 1) points; 2) goal difference; 3) number of goals scored.
(C) Champions; (R) Relegated

==== Matches ====
Date	Round	Opponents	Result F–A	Scorers	League position
26 February 2013	1	VB Addu	10–1	Fasir 12', Umar (2) 21', 30', Ashfaq (4) 32', 34', 45', 57, Niyaz 75', Umair (2) 82' 90'	1st
18 March 2013	1	BG Sports	1–0	Abdulla 55'	1st
24 March 2013	1	Valencia	5–0	Ashfaq (2) 5', 32', Umair 19', Fasir (2) 72', 89'	1st
28 March 2013	1	Club AYL	3–0	Thoriq 12', Umair (2) 71' (pen.), 80' (pen.)	1st
16 April 2013	1	Eagles	4–0	Umar 61', Yaamin 71', Ashfaq 83' (pen.), Niyaz 86'	1st
6 May 2013	1	Maziya	4–2	H. Niyaz 15', Umair (2) 26', 72', Ashfaq 70'	1st
20 May 2013	1	Victory	4–0	Umar 21', Ashfaq (3) 24', 38', 88'	1st
24 May 2013	2	Maziya	2–0	Fasir 7', Ashfaq 83'	1st
29 May 2013	2	BG Sports	1–0	Umair 81'	1st
3 June 2013	2	Valencia	2–1	Ashfaq (2) 72' (pen.), 80' (pen.)	1st
10 June 2013	2	Eagles	5–0	Ashfaq (3) 39', 51' (pen.), 60', Umar 67', Mansah 77'	1st
14 June 2013	2	VB Addu	2–0	Ashfaq 16', Umair 54' (pen.)	1st
19 June 2013	2	Victory	3–0	Umair 25', Fasir 27', Ashfaq 70'	1st
23 June 2013	2	Club AYL	5–0	Umair 21', Ashfaq (2) 31' (pen.), 52', Easa 71', Niyaz 87'	1st
30 June 2013	3	Club AYL	10–0	Yamaan 1' (o.g.), Shifan 8', Ashfaq (5) 10', 48', 54', 84', 87', Easa 25', Umair 41', Fasir 88'	1st
5 July 2013	3	BG Sports Club	2–1	Umair 16' (pen.), 43'	1st
16 July 2013	3	Valencia	2–0	Ashfaq (2) 5', 56'	1st
20 July 2013	3	Eagles	7–0	Umair 26', Ashfaq (3) 45+1', 48', 79, Fasir (2) 68', 87', H. Niyaz 81'	1st
28 July 2013	3	Maziya	1–0	Umair 22'	1st

=== FA Cup ===
Date	Round	Opponents	Result F–A	Scorers
5 August 2013	Quarter-finals	Victory	2–0*	
30 September 2013	Semi-finals	Eagles	3–0	Umair 64', Mansah 88', Fasir 90+2'
4 October 2013	Final	Maziya	1–0	Mansah 23'

* Victory Sports Club withdraw from 2013 FA Cup and the match awarded New Radiant a 2–0 win.

=== President's Cup ===
Date	Round	Opponents	Result F–A	Scorers
8 October 2013	Semi final 1	Maziya	3–1	Ashfaq (2) 56', 90+3', Umair 88'
23 October 2013	Final	Maziya	4–2 (aet)	Umair (2) 5' (pen.), 65', Ashfaq 107', H. Niyaz 119'

== See also ==
- List of unbeaten football club seasons
