= 2014 President's Cup (Maldives) final =

2014 President's Cup final
- Event: 2014 President's Cup
New Radiant	Maziya
1	0
- After extra time
- Date: 30 November 2014
- Venue: National Football Stadium, Malé

The 2014 President's Cup (Maldives) final was the 64th Final of the Maldives President's Cup.

== Route to the final ==
New Radiant
1st Semi	New Radiant	2–1	Maziya

Eagles
1st Semi	Eagles	1–0	Victory
3rd semi	Maziya	1–4	Eagles

== Match ==
=== Details ===
30 November 2014
21:00 UTC+5

New Radiant	1–0	Club Eagles
Ali Fasir 106'	Report

National Football Stadium, Malé

New Radiant	Club Eagles

GK	25	(Maldives) Imran Mohamed (c)
RB	4	(Maldives) Ahmed Abdulla
CB	17	(Maldives) Shafiu Ahmed
CB	3	(Maldives) Mohamed Shifan
LB	19	(Maldives) Mohamed Rasheed
CM	23	(Maldives) Ahmed Niyaz		(substituted off) 53'
CM	13	(Australia) Akram Abdul Ghanee	(yellow card) 114'
RM	14	(Maldives) Hamza Mohamed		(substituted off) 108'
AM	5	(Maldives) Ibrahim Fazeel		(substituted off) 94'
LM	17	(Spain) Escobedo Carmona Manuel David	(yellow card) 90+2'
CF	10	(Maldives) Mohammad Umair	(yellow card) 115'
Substitutes:
FW	11	(Maldives) Ali Fasir		(substituted in) 53'
MF	6	(Australia) Dane Milovanović		(substituted in) 94'
FW	24	(Maldives) Ahmed Suhail		(substituted in) 108'
Manager:
(Finland) Mika Lönnström

GK	25	(Maldives) Mohamed Faisal
LB	19	(Maldives) Abdulla Sameehu Moosa
CB	18	(Maldives) Hassan Sifaau Yoosuf
CB	2	(Maldives) Ahmed Nooman
RB		(Maldives) Hamdhaan Ibrahim		(substituted off) 108'
CM		(Maldives) Ibrahim Haseeb
CF		(Maldives) Imran Nasheed
RM		(Maldives) Ibrahim Mubeen Ahmed Rasheed
LM	10	(Maldives) Ismail Easa (c)	(yellow card) 98'
ST	7	(Maldives) Ahmed Imaaz		(substituted off) 87'
ST	23	(Maldives) Yasfaadh Habeeb		(substituted off) 76'
Substitutes:
FW		(Maldives) Ahmed Rasheed		(substituted in) 76'
FW	21	(Maldives) Hassan Adhuham		(substituted in) 87'
DF		(Maldives) Ansar Ibrahim		(substituted in) 108'
Manager:
(Maldives) Ismail Mahfooz

Match rules

- 90 minutes.
- 30 minutes of extra-time if necessary.
- Penalty shoot-out if scores still level.
- Maximum of three substitutions.

== See also ==
- 2014 President's Cup (Maldives)
