= 2015 President's Cup (Maldives) =

President's Cup
Tournament details
- Country: Maldives
- City: 2
- Venue: 2
- Dates: 15–30 September 2015
- Teams: 8

Final positions
- Champions: Maziya (1st title)
- Runners-up: New Radiant

Tournament statistics
- Matches played: 15
- Goals scored: 35 (2.33 per match)
- Top goal scorer: Alamu Bukola (3 goals)

The 2015 President's Cup was the 65th season of the President's Cup. New Radiant Sports Club were the defending champions, having beaten Eagles in last season's final in extra time.

This was the first tournament under its current tournament format.

== Participating teams ==
According to the current format, all teams playing in the 2015 Dhivehi Premier League would appear in the President's Cup.

=== Final draw ===
The draw took place on 12 August 2015 at the FAM House in Male'.

== Venues ==
2 venues in two islands were selected for the tournament. Group stage matches were played at both venues; (Group A matches in Kulhudhuffushi and Group B matches in Addu City), while the knock-out round matches were held at Addu City.

Addu City, Addu Atoll	2015 President's Cup (Maldives) is located in Maldives	Kulhudhuffushi, Haa Dhaalu Atoll
Addu Football Stadium	2015 President's Cup (Maldives) is located in Maldives	Kulhudhuffushi Zone Stadium
0°38′28.68″S 73°8′28.8″E	2015 President's Cup (Maldives) is located in Maldives	6°37′N 73°3′E
Capacity: 5,000	2015 President's Cup (Maldives) is located in Maldives	Capacity: 1,000

== Background ==
This was the second edition of this tournament that was played in a venue other than Male' since it was once held at Addu City in 1970. It was the first year that Kulhudhuffushi hosted the tournament.

== Format ==
The first round, or group stage, was a competition between the 8 teams divided among two groups of four, where each group engaged in a round-robin tournament within itself. The two highest ranked teams in each group advanced to the knockout stage. Teams were awarded three points for a win and one for a draw. When comparing teams in a group over-all result came before head-to-head.

Tie-breaking criteria for group play
The ranking of teams in each group was based on the following criteria:
1. Number of points
2. Goal difference
3. Number of goals scored
4. Number of points obtained in matches between tied teams
5. Goal difference in matches between tied teams
6. Number of goals scored in matches between tied teams
7. Drawing of lots

The two semi-final losers competed in a third place play-off. For any match after the group stage, a draw after 90 minutes of regulation time was followed by two 15 minute periods of extra time to determine a winner. If the teams were still tied, a penalty shoot-out was held to determine a winner

== Broadcasting rights ==
The broadcasting rights for some matches of 2015 Maldives President's Cup were given to the Television Maldives.

== Group stage ==
=== Group A ===
Pos	Team	Pld	W	D	L	GF	GA	GD	Pts	Qualification
1	New Radiant (Q)	3	2	0	1	7	4	+3	6	Advance to knockout stage
2	TC Sports (Q)	3	2	0	1	3	1	+2	6	Advance to knockout stage
3	BG Sports	3	2	0	1	3	3	0	6	
4	Mahibadhoo	3	0	0	3	2	7	−5	0	

Source: President's Cup
Rules for classification: Tie-breaking criteria
(Q) Qualified for the phase indicated
15 September
16:00

New Radiant	3–1	BG Sports
Viliam 47', 90+2'; Fazeel 48'	Report	26' David

Kulhudhuffushi Zone Stadium, Kulhudhuffushi
Referee: Shifan Abdul Raheem (Maldives)
16 September
16:00

TC Sports	2–0	Mahibadhoo
Nafiu 66'; Rafael 90'	Report

Kulhudhuffushi Zone Stadium, Kulhudhuffushi
18 September
16:00

BG Sports	1–0	Mahibadhoo
Hamdhaan 70'	Report

Kulhudhuffushi Zone Stadium, Kulhudhuffushi
19 September
16:00

New Radiant	0–1	TC Sports
	Report	45' Nafiu

Kulhudhuffushi Zone Stadium, Kulhudhuffushi
21 September
16:00

New Radiant	4–2	Mahibadhoo
Alamu 27', 69', 90'; Suhail 41'	Report	37' Da Silva; 53' Naushaad

Kulhudhuffushi Zone Stadium, Kulhudhuffushi
22 September
16:00

BG Sports	1–0	TC Sports
Philmon 4'	Report

Kulhudhuffushi Zone Stadium, Kulhudhuffushi

=== Group B ===
Pos	Team	Pld	W	D	L	GF	GA	GD	Pts	Qualification
1	Maziya (Q)	3	2	1	0	5	1	+4	7	Advance to knockout stage
2	Eagles (Q)	3	1	2	0	5	3	+2	5	Advance to knockout stage
3	Valencia	3	1	0	2	3	6	−3	3	
4	Victory	3	0	1	2	0	3	−3	1	

Source: President's Cup
Rules for classification: Tie-breaking criteria
(Q) Qualified for the phase indicated
16 September
16:00

Maziya	2–0	Valencia
Asadhulla 8'; Imaz 45'	Report

Addu Football Stadium, Addu City
16 September
16:00

Victory	0–0	Eagles
	Report

Addu Football Stadium, Addu City
18 September
16:00

Valencia	2–4	Eagles
Nihaan 53'; Awilo 59'	Report	18' Easa; 58' Reyes; 69' Nasheed; 87' Rizuwan

Addu Football Stadium, Addu City
19 September
16:00

Maziya	2–0	Victory
Pablo 38'; Yaamin	Report

Addu Football Stadium, Addu City
22 September
16:00

Maziya	1–1	Eagles
Umair 87' (pen.)	Report	42' (pen.) Easa

Addu Football Stadium, Addu City
22 September
16:00

Valencia	1–0	Victory
Nishan 26'	Report

Addu Football Stadium, Addu City

== Knockout stage ==
Semi-finals
26 September – Addu City
New Radiant	2
Eagles	1
27 September – Addu City
Maziya S&RC (pen.)	0(4)
TC Sports	0(2)

Final
4 October – Addu City
New Radiant	1
Maziya S&RC	3

=== Semi-finals ===
26 September
16:00

New Radiant	2–1	Eagles
Rilwan 32'; Ashad 84'	Report	81' (pen.) Abu

Addu Football Stadium, Addu City
26 September
16:00

Maziya S&RC	0–0	TC Sports
	Report
Penalties
Irufaan (penalty missed); Yaamin (penalty scored); Nashid (penalty scored); Samdhooh (penalty scored); Umair (penalty scored)	4–2	(penalty scored) Yohei; (penalty missed) Nafiu; (penalty missed) Naiz; (penalty scored) Rafael

Addu Football Stadium, Addu City

=== Final ===
4 October
16:00

New Radiant	1–3	Maziya S&RC
Fasir 24'	Report	7' Asadhilla; 39' Umair; 66' Pablo

Addu Football Stadium, Addu City
Referee: Ahmed Ameez (Maldives)

== Statistics ==
=== Scorers ===
Rank	Player	Club	Assists
—	—	—	—

=== Assists ===
Rank	Player	Club	Assists
—	—	—	—
