= 2012 President's Cup (Maldives) final =

2012 President's Cup final
- Event: 2012 President's Cup (Maldives)
New Radiant	Victory
0	0
- New Radiant won 2–1 on penalties
- Date: 15 October 2012
- Venue: Rasmee Dhandu Stadium, Malé

The 2012 President's Cup (Maldives) final was the 62nd Final of the Maldives President's Cup.

== Route to the final ==
New Radiant
1st Semi	New Radiant	2–1 (aet)	Victory

Victory
1st Semi	New Radiant	2–1 (aet)	Victory
3rd semi	Victory	3–2	Maziya

== Match ==
=== Details ===
2012
21:15 UTC+5

New Radiant	0–0	Victory
	Report; Report (Commentry)
Penalties
Fazeel (penalty scored); Kelani (penalty missed); A. Abdulla (penalty missed); Niyaz (penalty scored)	2–1	(penalty missed) Akram; (penalty scored) Umair; (penalty missed) Shafiu; (penalty missed) Fasir; (penalty missed) Rilwan

Rasmee Dhandu Stadium, Malé

New Radiant	Victory

GK	25	(Maldives) Imran Mohamed
RB	15	(Maldives) Samah Hussain
CB	22	(Nigeria) Kudus Omolade Kelani
CB	2	(Nigeria) Kingsley Chukwudi Nkurumeh
LB	4	(Maldives) Ahmed Abdulla
DM	23	(Maldives) Ahmed Niyaz	(yellow card) 35'
CM	20	(Bulgaria) Ivan Karamanov		(substituted off) 89'
AM	5	(Maldives) Ibrahim Fazeel	(yellow card) 50'
SS	7	(Maldives) Ali Ashfaq	(yellow card) 90+1'	(substituted off) 112'
SS	10	(Maldives) Ali Umar
CF	9	(Maldives) Ahmed Thoriq (c)
Substitutes:
GK	18	(Maldives) Ibrahim Labaan Shareef
DF	13	(Maldives) Mohamed Ajuvad Solah
DF	19	(Maldives) Mohamed Ihusan
MF	11	(Maldives) Mohamed Imran
MF	12	(Maldives) Muan Moosa Manik		(substituted on) 112'
MF	14	(Maldives) Naavy Mohamed
MF	16	(Maldives) Mohamed Hussain		(substituted on) 89'
Manager:
(Maldives) Mohamed Siyaz

GK	18	(Maldives) Mohamed Faisal
LB	12	(Maldives) Mohamed Rasheed
CB	8	(Maldives) Rilwan Waheed
CB	26	(Maldives) Shafiu Ahmed (c)	(yellow card) 63'
RB	20	(Maldives) Ibrahim Shinaz		(substituted off) 119'
CM	3	(Maldives) Mohamed Shifan	(yellow card) 23' (yellow-red card) 120+2'
AM	13	(Maldives) Akram Abdul Ghanee
AM	14	(Nigeria) Chinda Chizi Kaka	(red card) 71'
LF	45	(Maldives) Hassan Adhuham	(yellow card) 24'	(substituted off) 73'
RF	15	(Cameroon) Hansley Awilo	(yellow card) 68'
CF	10	(Maldives) Mohamed Umair
Substitutes:
POS	x
POS	x
POS	x
MF	6	(Maldives) Mohamed Shaffaz	(substituted on) 119'	(yellow card) 120'
POS	x
FW	7	(Maldives) Ali Fasir	(substituted on) 73'
POS	x
Manager:
(Maldives) Ali Suzain

Man of the match

Match officials

- Assistant referees:
- Fourth official
- Reserve official:

Match rules

- 90 minutes.
- 30 minutes of extra-time if necessary.
- Penalty shoot-out if scores still level.
- Seven named substitutes.
- Maximum of three substitutions.

=== Statistics ===
First half
	New Radiant	Victory
Total shots	5	7
Shots on target	1	4
Corner kicks	0	1
Fouls committed	10	9
Offsides	2	1
Yellow cards	1	2
Second yellow card & Red card	0	0
Red cards	0	0

Second half
	New Radiant	Victory
Total shots	8	4
Shots on target	4	2
Corner kicks	4	3
Fouls committed	15	12
Offsides	1	2
Yellow cards	2	2
Second yellow card & Red card	0	0
Red cards	0	1

Additional extra time
	New Radiant	Victory
Total shots	10	5
Shots on target	5	3
Corner kicks	6	2
Fouls committed	5	4
Offsides	0	0
Yellow cards	0	1
Second yellow card & Red card	0	1
Red cards	0	0

Overall
	New Radiant	Victory
Total shots	23	16
Shots on target	10	9
Corner kicks	10	6
Fouls committed	30	25
Offsides	3	3
Yellow cards	3	5
Second yellow card & Red card	0	1
Red cards	0	1

== See also ==
- 2012 President's Cup (Maldives)
