= 2012 New Radiant S.C. season =

New Radiant
- Chairman: Ali Waheed
- Head Coach: Mohamed Shiyaz
- Stadium: Rasmee Dhandu Stadium
- Dhivehi League: Winners
- FA Cup: Quarter-finals
- President's Cup: Winners
- Top goalscorer: League: Ali Ashfaq (20 goals); All: Ali Ashfaq (21 goals)
Home colours	Away colours

The 2012 season is New Radiant Sports Club's 33rd year in existence as a football club.

== Background ==
New Radiant finished at the 4th position of last year's Dhivehi League, 4th in FA Cup as they were beaten in the third place play-off match and as runners-up of the President's Cup.

Club appointed Ali Waheed, as the new chairman of the club and he appointed the team skipper Ahmed Thoriq as the club's new general secretary.

On 7 January 2012, club decided to establish a youth academy this year.

New Radiant signed Ibrahim Fazeel, Ali Ashfaq, Ali Umar and Imran Mohamed to strengthen club's goal, midfield and attack for the 2012 season, while Ahmed Niyaz and Adam Shareef renewed their contract with the club.

Ashfaq's signing was a Maldivian record signing of MVR 1.4 million.

Sobah Mohamed, Fareed Mohamed, Mohamed Jameel and Charles Wright Gaye left the club ang joined VB Addu FC.

They also signed 2 Nigerian defenders, Kudus Omolade Kelani and Kingsley Chukwudi Nkurumeh before the start of the season.

Club announced the signing of Ahmed Afrad, Mohamed Hussain and Ivan Karamanov during the mid-season break.

== Kit ==
Supplier: MediaNet / Sponsor: Milo
Source: Haveeru Online (Dhivehi)

Home	Away	Goalkeeper 1	Goalkeeper 2

== Friendlies ==
=== Mid-season ===
Date	Opponents	Result F–A	Scorers
30 June 2012	Mahibadhoo	1–1	n/a
1 July 2012	Vilamendhoo Resort	8–1	n/a

== Competitions ==
=== Overall ===
Competition	Started round	Final position / round	First match	Last match
Dhivehi League	—	Winner	18 April 2012	5 October 2012
FA Cup	Quarter-finals		12 September 2012	
President's Cup	Final Qualifier	Winner	8 October 2012	15 October 2012

=== Competition record ===
Competition	Record							
Competition	G	W	D*	L	GF	GA	GD	Win %
Dhivehi League	19	15	4	0	48	9	+39	78.95
FA Cup	1	0	0	1	0	1	−1	0.00
President's Cup	2	1	1	0	2	1	+1	50.00
Total	22	16	5	1	50	11	+39	72.73

*Draws include knockout matches decided on penalty kicks.

=== Dhivehi League ===
==== League table ====
Pos	Team	Pld	W	D	L	GF	GA	GD	Pts	Qualification or relegation
1	New Radiant SC	19	15	4	0	48	9	+39	49	2013 AFC Cup group stage President's Cup
2	Victory Sports Club	19	11	4	4	50	26	+24	37	President's Cup
3	Maziya S&RC	19	11	2	6	42	24	+18	35	2013 AFC Cup group stage ^{1} President's Cup
4	VB Addu FC	19	7	4	8	47	45	+2	25	President's Cup

Rules for classification: 1) points; 2) goal difference; 3) number of goals scored.

^{1} Maziya S&RC qualified for the 2013 AFC Cup as they won the 2012 Maldives FA Cup.
Updated to games played on 6 October 2012.
Source: RSSSF.com

==== Matches ====
Date	Round	Opponents	Result F–A	Scorers
18 April 2012	1	VB Addu	4–0	Umar 18', Ashfaq (2) 68', 90+3', Thoriq 90+1'
28 April 2012	1	Club AYL	3–0	Abdulla 34', Ashfaq 43', Fazeel 50' (pen.)
5 May 2012	1	Valencia	3–0	Ashfaq 8', Abdulla 49', Fazeel 89'
11 May 2012	1	Eagles	1–1	Fazeel 90+5'
20 May 2012	1	Vyansa	0–0	
26 May 2012	1	Victory	5–1	Thoriq (2) 21', 31', Fazeel 71', Ashfaq (2) 90+2' (pen.), 90+4'
31 May 2012	1	Maziya	1–0	Umar 75'
5 June 2012	2	Victory	0–0	
10 June 2012	2	Maziya	5–1	Abdulla 26' (pen.), Ashfaq (2) 28', 90, Thoriq (2) 78', 88'
10 July 2012	2	Eagles	1–0	Umar 36,
15 July 2012	2	Valencia	5–1	Karamanov 20', Ashfaq (2) 23', 84', Thoriq (2) 51', 73'
31 July 2012	2	Vyansa	1–0	Ashfaq 28'
6 August 2012	2	VB Addu	5–1	Fazeel 15', Thoriq (3) 53', 79', 82', Ashfaq 90+4'
11 August 2012	2	Club AYL	2–1	Fazeel 40' (pen.), Abdulla 76'
19 September 2012	3	Eagles	2–0	Fazeel 55', Ashfaq 87'
23 September 2012	3	VB Addu	0–0	
27 September 2012	3	Victory	3–1	Karamanov 44', Ashfaq (2) 66', 89'
30 September 2012	3	Club AYL	5–1	Ashfaq (5) 36', 52', 84' (pen.), 87', 88'
5 October 2012	3	Maziya	2–1	Fazeel 17', Thoriq 37'

=== FA Cup ===
Date	Round	Opponents	Result F–A	Scorers
12 September 2012	Quarter-finals	Eagles	0–1	

=== President's Cup ===
Date	Round	Opponents	Result F–A	Scorers
8 October 2012	Final Qualifier	Victory	2–1(aet)	Ashfaq 100' (pen.), Imran 112'
15 October 2012	Final	Victory	0–0 (aet) (2–1 p)	

== See also ==
- List of unbeaten football club seasons
