= Ali Fasir =

Maldivian footballer (born 1988)

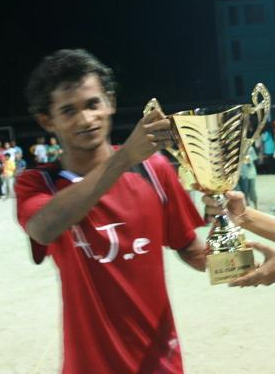

Personal information
- Full name: Ali Fasir
- Date of birth: 4 September 1988 (age 38)
- Place of birth: Eydhafushi, Maldives
- Height: 1.70 m (5 ft 7 in)
- Positions: Winger; striker

Team information
- Current team: New Radiant
- Number: 10

Senior career*
Years	Team	Apps	(Gls)
2006	Club Eagles		(0)
2008–2009	Club All Youth Linkage	17	(6)
2010	Club Valencia	20	(6)
2011	New Radiant	18	(16)
2012	Victory	6	(4)
2013–2015	New Radiant	47	(31)
2016	TC Sports Club	21	(29)
2017–2018	New Radiant	58	(38)
2019–2020	Club Eagles	18	(7)
2020–2022	Club Valencia	14	(9)
2021	→ Club Eagles (loan)	0	(0)
2023–2025	Maziya	7	(4)
2025–	New Radiant	4	(8)

International career^{‡}
2010–2016	Maldives U23	13	(4)
2010–	Maldives	80	(18)
Medal record
Club All Youth Linkage
Runner-up	Second Division	2008
New Radiant
Winner	Charity Shield	2013
Winner	Dhivehi League	2013
Winner	Maldives FA Cup	2013
Winner	President's Cup	2013
Winner	Charity Shield	2014
Winner	Dhivehi League	2014
Winner	President's Cup	2014
Winner	Dhivehi Premier League	2015
Winner	Dhivehi Premier League	2017
Winner	Maldives FA Cup	2017
Winner	President's Cup	2017
Winner	Malé League	2018
Runner-up	President's Cup	2011
Runner-up	Maldives FA Cup	2014
Runner-up	Charity Shield	2015
Runner-up	President's Cup	2015
Victory
Runner-up	Dhivehi League	2012
Runner-up	President's Cup	2012
TC Sports
Runner-up	Dhivehi Premier League	2016
Runner-up	Maldives FA Cup	2016
Runner-up	President's Cup	2016
Maziya
Winner	Charity Shield	2023
Winner	President's Cup	2023
Maldives under-23
Third place	South Asian Games	2010
Third place	MNC Cup	2013
Maldives
Third place	AFC Challenge Cup	2014
First place	SAFF Championship	2018
- * Club domestic league appearances and goals as of 21 October 2025 ‡ National team caps and goals as of 14 October 2025

Ali Fasir (Dhivehi: ޢަލީ ފާސިރު; born 4 September 1988), known by a nickname Sentey, is a Maldivian footballer who plays as a winger or striker for New Radiant and the Maldives national team.

Fasir began his career at Club Eagles after being spotted by the club during their training camps. He played one season with the club and spent a year without a club until he was offered from Club All Youth Linkage. He played a major role to promote his side from second division to Dhivehi League. Fasir had an impressive Dhivehi League debut season and then signed for the most successful Dhivehi League team Club Valencia for the following season. In the 2011 season, Fasir signed for New Radiant and had a breakthrough year scoring 18 goals from 23 appearances. He was the league second top scorer (16 goals) with just one goal behind Victory's Ibrahim Fazeel. After the end of this remarkable season, Fasir signed with rivals Victory but had to stay away from football due to a fibula fracture during a national side practice session.

Fasir returned to New Radiant in November 2012. During his second spell at New Radiant, Fasir won a quadruple (all domestic competitions; Charity Shield, Dhivehi League, FA Cup and President's Cup) with a remarkable 100% winning record in 2013 season. He also played his first AFC Cup tournament, helping the club to reach the quarter-finals, having scored in the group stage, round of 16 and also in the quarter-finals. His displays for club and country led to him finish second in the Haveeru Maldivian Footballer of the year 2014, despite having to miss some of the important matches at the end of the season due to an injury. After recovering from injury, Fasir scored his first goal in a cup final, leading his side win the President's Cup with his goal. He scored 23 goals from 24 appearances for his club during the 2014 season.

Fasir represented Maldives at under-23 level in 2010, having called up for the 2010 South Asian Games and 2010 Asian Games. In the same year, he made his debut for the Maldives senior side in an exhibition game. He was part of the Maldives teams represented the SAFF Championship in 2011 and 2013. Fasir scored the equalizing goal in an acrobatic style in the 2014 AFC Challenge Cup bronze medal-winning match against Afghanistan.

== Early life ==
Fasir was born on 4 September 1988 in Eydhafushi, Maldives and attended Baa Atoll Education Centre. Fasir was his parents'; Aishath Ali and Ahmed Shaheem's third child among the six. From the other children, four sons; Hussain Fasir, Mohamed Fasir, Ismail Fasir, Abdulla Fasir and daughter Fathimath Faiha, Mohamed Fasir was a former footballer who played with him during his early career times at Club Eagles and Club All Youth Linkage, until Mohamed suffered a serious injury which he took four years to recover completely.

Growing up in an island of Maldives, Fasir was an impressive player since a very young age and continued impressing the football spectators at school and island level until he was first offered by Club Eagles.

== Club career ==
=== Club Eagles ===
==== 2006 season ====
Fasir was first spotted by a Malé League team, Club Eagles during their training camp held at his home land Eydhafushi in 2006. Fasir was included in the three players Club Eagles offered the contract from Eydhafushi and he was later released at the end of the season as his contract got expired.

=== Club All Youth Linkage ===
==== 2008 season ====
In 2007, Club All Youth Linkage, a second division team noticed Fasir during an island level football tournament held in Eydhafushi. Club AYL signed him for the 2008 season and Fasir played a major role to qualify and win the 2009 Dhivehi League play-off round as 2008 second division tournament finalists to qualify the club to Dhivehi League for the first time.

==== 2009 season ====
Fasir played with the number 7 shirt this season and made his Dhivehi League debut in their first match of the 2009 season against VB Sports Club on 6 February 2009. He also scored in the 3–2 win against VB on that day. On 21 February 2009, Fasir scored in the 2–2 draw against New Radiant. On 5 June 2009, Fasir scored two goals against Kalhaidhoo ZJ in their 8–1 win and also assisted Fauzan Habeeb to score their third goal of the game. Fasir scored his second goal against VB Sports club on 26 June 2009 and he also received his first yellow card in the Dhivehi League.

On 17 July 2009, Fasir made his Maldives FA Cup debut against Victory in the quarter finals but lost the game 2–1.

On 15 August 2009, Fasir assisted Santosh Sahukhala score in the injury time against New Radiant where they won 4–1. Club AYL went on to win against Kalhaidhoo 4–0 on 27 August 2009, with a goal from him and he also assisted Ju Manu Rai to score their second goal of the game.

As Club AYL finished the 2009 Dhivehi League at the fifth place in their debut season, they played all the matches in 2010 Dhivehi League play-off under the captaincy of Fasir.

Fasir scored against Vyansa on 2 October in their 4–1 win and also scored the winning goals against Kalhaidhoo ZJ on 8 October 2009 where they won 3–2 and against Club Valencia on 14 October where they won 2–1 to qualify to 2010 Dhivehi League as the winner of the 2010 Dhivehi League play-off.

The only match Fasir missed in the season was a league match against Victory, due to injury.

=== Club Valencia ===
==== 2010 season ====
In January 2010, Fasir signed a one-year contract with Club Valencia receiving the number 7 shirt.

He made his debut on 26 March against New Radiant in the Dhivehi League and scored in the first minute to take the lead in a 4–1 defeat. On 16 May 2010, Fasir was brought down inside the Vyansa penalty area which awarded a penalty for Valencia, which was converted into a goal by Shamweel Qasim. He also scored the third goal of the game by himself in the same match which ended as a 3–0 win. On 23 May 2010, Fasir set up the first two goals which were scored by Ahmed Nashid in a 7–1 win against Thoddoo. On 27 May 2010, he set up the goal scored by Assadhulla Abdulla in a 1–1 draw against Vyansa. Fasir provided two assists to Ahmed Nashid in a 2–0 win against Club AYL on 4 June 2010. On 25 July 2010, Fasir scored two controversial solo goals, by beating three defenders in the first goal and beating one in the second against New Radiant in a 4–4 draw. On 24 August 2010, Fasir set up the only goal of the game in a 1–0 win against Maziya which was scored by Assad Abdul Ghanee. On 17 September 2010, Fasir scored his side's only goal against Thoddoo, after beating their goalkeeper. On 21 September 2010, Fasir set up the winning goal to Assadhulla Abdulla after beating the Club AYL goalkeeper in the 2–1 win.

On 30 September 2010, Fasir scored his first Maldives FA Cup goal against Maziya in the quarter finals, where the match ended as a 1–1 draw but Valencia won the penalties 3–1 with Fasir's kick hit the cross-bar.

The final league game against Vyansa was the only game he did not appear in the field in the 2010 season.

=== New Radiant ===
==== 2011 season ====
Fasir signed to New Radiant on a one-year deal in 2011 and was given the number 10 shirt.

Fasir made his debut to his new club against VB Sports Club in the opening match of 2011 Dhivehi League on 30 March 2011, scoring one and assisting one goal in a 3–2 defeat. On 9 April 2011, Fasir set up the first goal which was scored by Ahmed Thoriq and also scored the second goal himself in a 3–1 win against Clyb AYL. Fasir scored their side's only goal in the injury time of the second half from a penalty against Vyansa. He also received his first yellow card in the New Radiant shirt, in the same match on 16 April 2011. On 23 April 2011, Fasir scored against his former club Valencia in a 4–2 win. On 20 May 2011, Fasir scored against Victory from a free-kick in a 3–2 defeat. On 30 May 2011, Fasir scored his first hat-trick for the Blues, in a 5–0 win against Club AYL, where his second goal came from a penalty. Fasir assisted Ahmed Niyaz's goal and also scored a solo goal himself beating two defenders inside the penalty area to win the league match 3–1 against Vyansa on 12 June 2011. On 15 June 2011, Fasir scored his second hat-trick for New Radiant in a 7–0 win against Club Eagles. His first goal of the match was from a penalty which was rewarded when Eagles defender fouled Fasir in the penalty area in the first minute of the game. In the same game, he also assisted their second goal, which was scored by Wright Charles Gaye. On 24 June 2011, Fasir scored New Radiant's only goal from a penalty, which equalized the score which ended 1–1 in the full-time. On 11 September 2011, Fasir scored against Valencia in a 2–2 draw. Fasir scored his side's first two goals in a 6–1 win over Victory on 20 September 2011.

In an FA Cup quarter finals match against Eagles on 29 September 2011, Fasir scored their first goal from a penalty kick in a 2–1 win. Fasir made his President's Cup debut against Maziya in a 2–1 win on 16 October 2011 in the semifinal qualifier. In the third place play-off match of the FA Cup, Fasir scored the only goal against Victory where they lost 3–1.

=== Victory Sports Club ===
==== 2012 season ====
"Sentey is back - delighted to watch this talented player back from injury it seems that scoring is just a habit for him."

— Victory coach Ali Suzain on Ali Fasir

On 13 November 2011, he signed a one-year contract with Victory Sports Club. He was given the vacated number 7 shirt worn by Mukhthar Naseer during the 2011 season.

Fasir spent most of the 2012 season out of football due to a fibula fracture in the practice match between the national team and New Radiant. He was expected to return in five months but he started practice with Victory in exact 6 months. After recovering from the injury, Fasir made his debut for Victory against Club Valencia after a month of practice, in a league match on 12 August 2012, coming on for Fauzan Habeeb at the start of second half. It just took two minutes for him to score his first goal for Victory with his first touch on the ball. In the same match, he also set up a goal for Hnsley Awilo where they won the match 8–2.

On 13 September 2012, he started his first match for the club in an FA Cup quarter finals match against Valencia, where he scored the game's first match in the 4–2 win. On 17 September 2012, Fasir again scored the games' first goal after beating the goalkeeper in a 4–2 win against Club AYL. Fasir scored in a 5–0 win against Club Eagles on 22 September 2012 again, by beating the opponent goalkeeper. On 1 October 2012, Fasir scored the only goal of the game to win three points for his side against Maziya. Fasir assisted the opening goal of the match scored by Hansley Awilo in a 5–2 win against VB Addu FC on 5 October 2012.

On 15 October 2012, Fasir played in the President's Cup final against his former club New Radiant, coming in to play for Hassan Adhuham in the second half. The match ended goalless for 120 minutes and ended as runners-up as they lost the penalty shoot-out 2–1. Fasir's penalty went over the cross-bar.

=== Return to New Radiant ===
==== 2013 season ====
On 16 November 2012, Fasir completed his return to the club and signed a one-year contract and claimed the number 5 shirt.

Fasir made his New Radiant return debut in his first ever Charity Shield match against Maziya in a 3–1 win, on 21 February 2013. On 26 February 2013, he scored his first goal of his second spell against VB Addu FC in a 10–1 win. Fasir made his AFC Cup debut in a 1–0 home win against Sun Hei in New Radiant's first game of the 2013 AFC Cup group stage. He scored twice in the 5–0 league win against Club Valencia on 24 March 2013. Fasir scored his first continental goal in a 3–1 home win against Yangon United in an AFC Cup group stage match on 9 April 2013. He also assisted Sylla Mansah's goal in the same match. On 24 April 2013, Fasir scored the first two goals against Sun Hei in a 3–0 win in the AFC Cup group stage match at the Mong Kok Stadium.

In an AFC Cup Round of 16 match against Selangor at home, Fasir scored in the crucial 2–0 win in the extra time on 15 May 2013, sending the team into the quarter-finals of the AFC Cup. On 24 May 2013, Fasir scored against Maziya in a 2–0 victory. Fasir assisted Ali Ashfaq against Club Eagles in a 5–0 win on 10 June 2013 and also in the following match against VB Addu FC in a 2–0 win on 14 June 2013. On 19 June 2013, Fasir scored against his former club Victory in a 3–0 win. On 30 June 2013, Fasir scored against Club AYL in a controversial 10–0 win. Fasir scored twice in the 7–0 win against Club Eagles on 20 July 2013. On 28 July 2013, Fasir set up the only goal in the last match of the 2013 Dhivehi League, scored by Mohamed Umair making it possible for the team to finish the league as champions with a 100% winning record.

On 17 September 2013, Fasir scored against Al-Kuwait in a 7–2 home defeat in the AFC Cup quarter-finals first leg. He scored in the FA Cup semi-finals match against Club Eagles in a 3–0 win on 30 September 2013.

On 27 November 2013, New Radiant former coach Velizar Popov showed interest to sign Fasir along with Akram Abdul Ghanee to his Sur Sports Club of Oman Professional League and an official loan request was received by New Radiant on 8 December 2013. New Radiant decided to release both players but later New Radiant decided to cancel the loan transfer due to the financial situation in the Sur Sports Club.

==== 2014 season ====
On 30 November 2013, New Radiant announced on their official website that Fasir signed a new contract with the club, keeping him at the club until 2015. On 9 January 2014, club appointed Fasir as the third-captain of New Radiant Sports Club. He was given the number 11 shirt for the new season, which was personally sponsored by the former New Radiant chairman, Ibrahim Nooraddeen.

He was nominated for the 2013 Haveeru Sports Awards for the best player and ended at fourth, with 870 points.

Fasir scored his first goal of the season in the Charity Shield match against Maziya in a 3–1 win on 10 June 2014. He scored his first league goal against Club AYL, on 16 June 2014 in a 7–0 win. In the same match, he also assisted the first goal of the match which was scored by Escobedo Carmona Manuel David. On 7 July 2014, Fasir scored twice in the 4–0 win against Mahibadhoo. Fasir scored twice and also assisted Ibrahim Fazeel's goal against Club Eagles in a 4–1 win on 14 July 2014. On 20 July 2014, Fasir set up two goals, which were scored by Mohamed Umair and Shamweel Qasim, and scored one goal himself in a 3–0 win against Club Valencia. On 28 July 2014, Fasir scored his first hat-trick of the season against BG Sports Club in a 6–0 victory. Fasir missed the last game of the Dhivehi League between the rivals Maziya due to suspension for receiving two yellow cards.

On 21 August 2014, Fasir scored his 50th Dhivehi League goal against Club Valencia, with a beautiful lob over the goalkeeper. On 30 September 2014, in a 5–1 win against BG Sports Club, Fasir scored twice where his second came from a penalty. In an FA Cup quarter-finals match against Mahibadhoo, Fasir scored their side's first two goals; second goal from a free-kick, and set up the third and fourth goal which were scored by Escobedo Carmona Manuel David and Akram Abdul Ghanee, in a 6–3 win on 14 October 2014. Disciplinary actions were taken against Fasir, along with teammates Mohamed Rasheed and Hamza Mohamed for playing in an Eid al-Adha football tournament in his island Eydhafushi and failing to report to club training after the Eid break. Due to this, he was suspended for the last game of Dhivehi League second round match against Mahibadhoo and was also demanded for a public apology.

On 22 October 2014, Fasir scored an absolute screamer, to win three points against Club Valencia in the last second of the game, where they won the match 2–1. On 26 October 2014, Fasir scored the game's only goal against Victory, to win their side another three points. On 5 November 2014, Fasir scored five goals against Mahibadhoo in a 6–1 victory, where he scored his last goal from the spot. In the same match, he was brought down in the penalty box by a Mahibadhoo player, from which he faced a major injury, which costed him the season's Golden Boot to Assadhulla Abdulla. According to the CT scan reports, it showed no fracture but muscle pain due to his previous injury occurred in 2012 during the national team practice.

After the injury, Fasir started joining the practice sessions with New Radiant on 17 November 2014 and made his first appearance after injury against Maziya on 23 November 2014 in a 2–1 win, coming in for Hamza Mohamed with 8 minutes remaining for the final whistle in the President's Cup final qualifier. On 30 November 2014, Fasir came in for Ahmed Niyaz in the 53rd minute of the President's Cup final and scored the winning goal in the 106th minute against Club Eagles, to win the President's Cup for the third time in a row for New Radiant.

After the end of the season, Fasir underwent a minor surgery to take off a plate which was inserted in 2012 to support his leg due to an injury suffered during a national team practice match.

==== 2015 season ====
On 11 January 2015, club announced Fasir as their new vice-captain, and was handed the number 7 jersey worn by legend Ali Ashfaq, which was vacated following his departure since 2014.

He finished as the runner-up to Assadhulla Abdulla for the 2014 Haveeru Sports Awards best player.

Fasir made his season debut on 15 April 2015, against Ayeyawady United in the AFC Cup group stage match, coming in for Rilwan Waheed in the 75th minute at the Thuwunna Stadium where the match ended goalless. On 20 April 2015, Fasir made his Dhivehi Premier League debut in the 56th minute, replacing Ahmed Niyaz and scored in the last second of the injury time, helping his team giving a score line of 3–1 against Victory. This goal hardly managed to maintain his record of scoring in his first league match of each season, since 2009.

== International career ==
=== Maldives under-23 team ===
Fasir was called up for the Maldives national under-23 football team for the first time, for the 2010 South Asian Games held in Dhaka. He made his debut in their first game against Bhutan as a second-half substitute, where they won the match 1–0, on 30 January 2010. He started his first game for the under-23 side against Bangladesh in a 1–0 defeat in the last group stage match, on 3 February 2010. Fasir also featured in the tournament's third place play-off match, where they won the bronze after beating India 3–1 on penalties after a goalless 90 minutes. Fasir was also called up for the 2010 Asian Games held in Guangzhou later that year, but was an unused substitute throughout the tournament.

On 18 November 2013, the Football Association of Maldives chose Fasir to play in the 2013 MNC Cup (an invitational friendly tournament) when Ali Ashfaq refused to play for the under-23 side as one of the three over-aged players. He played in the tournament and scored in a 1–0 win against Papua New Guinea and also in the 2–1 defeat against Indonesia. Maldives won bronze medal in the invitational friendly tournament.

=== Maldives senior team ===
Fasir made his debut for the Maldives senior side on 12 October 2010, in an international friendly against Indonesia replacing Ali Ashfaq in the second half injury time, where they lost 3–0 at the Siliwangi Stadium. Fasir started his first game for Maldives on 24 November 2011 in a 2–1 friendly win against Seychelles at the Rasmee Dhandu Stadium.

Fasir was an un-used substitute in the 2014 FIFA World Cup qualification second round both legs against Iran, and also in the 2011 Indian Ocean Island Games which were played in the mid-2011. He was called up for the major regional tournament SAFF Championship for the first time, in 2011's edition and featured in the last group stage match against Bangladesh in a 3–1 win, replacing Ibrahim Fazeel in the 80th minute at the Jawaharlal Nehru Stadium, Delhi on 6 December 2011.

Fasir spent most of the 2012 season out of football due to a fibula fracture in the practice match between the national team and New Radiant, when New Radiant goalkeeper Imran Mohamed and Fasir both went for the ball and he twisted his ankle, on 2 February 2012. He missed the 2012 AFC Challenge Cup and 2012 Nehru Cup due to the injury.

Fasir was included in the 2013 SAFF Championship in Kathmandu, and played his first full match in their first game in a sensational 10–0 win against Sri Lanka on 2 September 2013. In the same game, he also scored his first goal for the national side. In their second game against Bhutan, on his birthday; 4 September 2013, he scored a brace in an 8–2 win. Fasir also made two assists for Ali Ashfaq in the same game.

On 13 May 2014, Fasir scored twice, in an exhibition game against Laos. Fasir was selected in the 2014 AFC Challenge Cup and played his first game against Myanmar, in a 3–2 defeat. In the third place play-off match, he scored the precious game equalizer; 1–1 against Afghanistan from a side bicycle kick in the 118th minute, where they won the bronze after winning the penalty shootout but unfortunately his spot kick went wide.

== Playing style ==
Fasir has good finishing, pace, dribbling, positioning and crossing ability. He is able to play on wither wing as well through the center of the pitch, making him a versatile attacker. Although Fasir is right footed, He is also able to control the ball and cross and finish well with his left foot. He occasionally plays as an attacking midfielder.

== Outside football ==
=== Personal life ===
Fasir married to a former radio host at Dhi FM Aishath Aboobakuru on 26 December 2013, divorcing in 2016.

=== Commercial endorsements ===
On 19 September 2017, Litus Automobiles unveiled Fasir as their brand ambassador. Under the ambassadorship program he will feature in the advertisements, which includes TV commercials, billboards, posters and events conducted by Litus Automobiles.

== Career statistics ==
=== Club ===
As of match played 26 December 2021

Club performance			League			Cup			League Cup			Continental			Other			Total			Discipline	
Club	League	Season	App.	Goals	Assists	App.	Goals	Assists	App.	Goals	Assists	App.	Goals	Assists	App.	Goals	Assists	App.	Goals	Assists	A yellow card	A red card
Maldives			League			FA Cup			President's Cup			Asia			Other			Total			A yellow card	A red card
Eagles	Malé League	2006	?	0	?	—			—			—			—			?	0	?	0	0
Club AYL	Second Division	2008	6	?	?	—			—			—			—			6	?	?	0	0
Club AYL	Dhivehi League	2009	17	6	4	1	0	0	—			—			4 (Note: All appearances in Dhivehi League play-off)	2	0	22	8	4	1	0
Club AYL	Total		23	6	4	1	0	0	—			—			4	2	0	28	8	4	1	0
Valencia	Dhivehi League	2010	20	6	6	3	1	0	—			—			—			23	7	6	0	0
New Radiant	Dhivehi League	2011	18	16	4	3	2	0	3	0	0	—			—			24	18	4	3	0
Victory	Dhivehi League	2012	6	4	2	3	1	0	3	0	1	—			—			12	5	3	0	0
New Radiant	Dhivehi League	2013	18	8	5	2	1	0	2	0	1	9 (Note: All appearances in AFC Cup)	5	2	1 (Note: Appearance in FA Charity Shield)	0	0	32	14	8	6	0
New Radiant	Dhivehi League	2014	16	19	7	1	2	2	2	1	0	6	0	0	1	1	0	26	23	9	3	0
New Radiant	Premier League	2015	13	4	1	—			5	1	1	3	1	0	—			21	6	2	2	0
New Radiant	Total		47	31	13	3	3	2	9	2	2	18	6	2	2	1	0	79	43	19	11	0
TC Sports Club	Premier League	2016	21	29	6	3	2	0	2	2	0	—			—			26	33	6	1	0
New Radiant	Malé League	2017	14	4	10	2	4	0	2	1	2	—			—			32	21	19	2	0
New Radiant	Premier League	2017	14	12	7	2	4	0	2	1	2	—			—			32	21	19	2	0
New Radiant	Malé League	2018	14	7	10	—	—	—	—	—	—	6	5	1	—			36	27	16	1	0
New Radiant	Premier League	2018	16	15	5	—	—	—	—	—	—	6	5	1	—			36	27	16	1	0
New Radiant	Total		58	38	32	2	4	0	2	1	2	6	5	1	—			68	48	35	3	0
Eagles	Premier League	2019–20	18	7	8	—			—			—			—			18	7	8	2	0
Valencia	Premier League	2020–21	14	9	2	—			—			—			—			14	9	2	0	0
Valencia	Premier League	2021–22	0	0	0	0	0	0	2	4	0	0	0	0	1	0	0	3	4	0	0	0
Valencia	Total		14	9	2	0	0	0	2	4	0	0	0	0	1	0	0	17	13	2	0	0
Eagles (loan)	Premier League	2020–21	—			—			—			1 (Note: Appearance in AFC Cup play-off)	0	0	—			1	0	0	0	0
Career total			225	146	77	18	13	2	21	9	5	25	11	3	7	3	0	296	182	87	21	0

=== International ===
As of match played 14 October 2025

* Played as aged over 23 years.

Maldives under-23 team
Year	Apps	Goals
2010	7	0
2013*	3	2
2016*	3	2
Total	13	4
Maldives national team
Year	Apps	Goals
2010	1	0
2011	5	0
2013	7	3
2014	6	3
2015	10	1
2016	9	1
2017	6	3
2018	7	1
2019	3	0
2021	10	2
2022	2	0
2023	5	0
2024	2	2
2025	7	2
Total	80	18

=== International goals ===
==== Under–23 ====
Scores and results list Maldives U–23's goal tally first.

#	Date	Venue	Opponent	Score	Result	Competition
1.	21 November 2013	Gelora Bung Karno Stadium, Jakarta	Papua New Guinea	1–0	0–1	2013 Media Nusantara Citra Cup
2.	24 November 2013	Gelora Bung Karno Stadium, Jakarta	Indonesia	1–0	2–1	2013 Media Nusantara Citra Cup
3.	15 February 2016	SAI Centre, Paltan Bazaar	Bangladesh	1–2	2–2 (4–5 p.)	2016 South Asian Games
4.	15 February 2016	SAI Centre, Paltan Bazaar	Bangladesh	2–2	2–2 (4–5 p.)	2016 South Asian Games

==== Senior team ====
Scores and results list the Maldives goal tally first.
^{≠} Match not considered a full A-international by FIFA but it is for the Maldives FA.

#	Date	Venue	Opponent	Score	Result	Competition
1.	2 September 2013	Dasarath Rangasala Stadium, Kathmandu	Sri Lanka	8–0	10–0	2013 SAFF Championship
2.	4 September 2013	Dasarath Rangasala Stadium, Kathmandu	Bhutan	1–0	8–2	2013 SAFF Championship
3.	4 September 2013	Dasarath Rangasala Stadium, Kathmandu	Bhutan	5–2	8–2	2013 SAFF Championship
4.	13 May 2014	National Football Stadium, Malé	Laos	1–0	7–1	International Friendly^{≠}
5.	13 May 2014	National Football Stadium, Malé	Laos	7–1	7–1	International Friendly^{≠}
6.	29 May 2014	National Football Stadium, Malé	Afghanistan	1–1	1–1 (8–7 p)	2014 AFC Challenge Cup
7.	28 December 2015	Trivandrum International Stadium, Thiruvananthapuram	Afghanistan	1–1	1–4	2015 SAFF Suzuki Cup
8.	6 September 2016	National Football Stadium, Malé	Laos	1–0	4–0	2019 AFC Asian Cup qualification
9.	6 June 2017	Dubai Sports City Football Academy, Dubai	Afghanistan	1–1	1–2	International Friendly
10.	13 June 2017	Changlimithang Stadium, Thimphu	Bhutan	1–0	2–0	2019 AFC Asian Cup qualification
11.	10 October 2017	National Football Stadium, Malé	Oman	1–2	1–3	2019 AFC Asian Cup qualification
12.	15 September 2018	Bangabandhu National Stadium, Dhaka	India	2–0	2–1	2018 SAFF Championship Final
13.	15 June 2021	Sharjah Stadium, Sharjah	Philippines	1–1	1–1	2022 FIFA World Cup qualification
14.	9 November 2021	Colombo Racecourse, Colombo	Sri Lanka	2–0	4–4	2021 Four Nations Football Tournament
15.	13 November 2024	Bashundhara Kings Arena, Dhaka	Bangladesh	0–1	0–1	International Friendly
16.	13 November 2024	Bashundhara Kings Arena, Dhaka	Bangladesh	0–1	2–1	International Friendly
17.	25 March 2025	New Clark City Athletics Stadium, Capas	Philippines	1–2	1–4	2027 AFC Asian Cup qualification
18.	6 September 2025	Colombo Racecourse, Colombo	Sri Lanka	3–0	3–0	2025 South Asian Super Cup
19.	31 March 2026	National Football Stadium, Malé	Timor-Leste	2–1	2–1	2027 AFC Asian Cup qualification

=== International appearances ===
==== Under–23 ====
Result list in Maldives home for all games

#	Date	Venue	Opponent	Result	Competition
1	30 January 2010	Bangabandhu National Stadium, Dhaka	Bhutan	1–0	2010 South Asian Games
2	1 February 2010	Bangabandhu National Stadium, Dhaka	Nepal	1–0	2010 South Asian Games
3	3 February 2010	Bangabandhu National Stadium, Dhaka	Bangladesh	0–1	2010 South Asian Games
4	5 February 2010	Bangabandhu National Stadium, Dhaka	Afghanistan	0–1	2010 South Asian Games
5	7 February 2010	Bangabandhu National Stadium, Dhaka	India	0–0 (3–1 p.)	2010 South Asian Games
6	11 August 2010	Galolhu National Stadium, Malé	Singapore	1–0	International Friendly
7	13 August 2010	Galolhu National Stadium, Malé	Singapore	0–2	International Friendly
8	21 November 2013	Gelora Bung Karno Stadium, Jakarta	Papua New Guinea	1–0	2013 MNC Cup
9	22 November 2013	Gelora Bung Karno Stadium, Jakarta	Laos	1–2	2013 MNC Cup
10	24 November 2013	Gelora Bung Karno Stadium, Jakarta	Indonesia	1–2	2013 MNC Cup
11	8 February 2016	SAI Centre, Paltan Bazaar	Sri Lanka	3–1	2016 South Asian Games
12	10 February 2016	SAI Centre, Paltan Bazaar	India	2–3	2016 South Asian Games
13	15 February 2016	SAI Centre, Paltan Bazaar	Bangladesh	2–2 (4–5 p.)	2016 South Asian Games

==== Senior team ====
Result list in Maldives home for all games
^{≠} Match not considered a full A-international by FIFA but it is for the Maldives FA.

#	Date	Venue	Opponent	Result	Competition
1	12 October 2010	Siliwangi Stadium, Bandung	Indonesia	0–3	International Friendly
2	7 June 2011	Jalan Besar Stadium, Kallang	Singapore	0–4	International Friendly
3	10 July 2011	National Football Stadium, Malé	India	0–1	International Friendly
4	22 November 2011	National Football Stadium, Malé	Seychelles	3–0	International Friendly
5	24 November 2011	National Football Stadium, Malé	Seychelles	2–1	International Friendly
6	6 December 2011	Jawaharlal Nehru Stadium, Delhi	Bangladesh	3–1	2011 SAFF Championship
7	12 February 2013	National Football Stadium, Malé	Pakistan	1–0	International Friendly
8	14 February 2013	National Football Stadium, Malé	Pakistan	3–1	International Friendly
9	2 September 2013	Dasarath Rangasala Stadium, Kathmandu	Sri Lanka	10–0	2013 SAFF Championship
10	4 September 2013	Dasarath Rangasala Stadium, Kathmandu	Bhutan	8–2	2013 SAFF Championship
11	4 September 2013	Dasarath Rangasala Stadium, Kathmandu	Afghanistan	0–0	2013 SAFF Championship
12	9 September 2013	Dasarath Rangasala Stadium, Kathmandu	India	0–1	2013 SAFF Championship
13	29 November 2013	Stade Linité, Victoria, Seychelles	Seychelles	1–2	International Friendly
14	13 May 2014	National Football Stadium, Malé	Laos	7–1	International Friendly^{≠}
15	19 May 2014	National Football Stadium, Malé	Myanmar	2–3	2014 AFC Challenge Cup
16	21 May 2014	National Football Stadium, Malé	Kyrgyzstan	2–0	2014 AFC Challenge Cup
17	23 May 2014	National Football Stadium, Malé	Palestine	0–0	2014 AFC Challenge Cup
18	27 May 2014	National Football Stadium, Malé	Philippines	2–3	2014 AFC Challenge Cup
19	27 May 2014	National Football Stadium, Malé	Afghanistan	1–1 (8–7 p.)	2014 AFC Challenge Cup
20	11 June 2015	National Football Stadium, Malé	Qatar	0–1	2018 FIFA World Cup qualification
21	16 June 2015		Hong Kong	0–2	2018 FIFA World Cup qualification
–	31 July 2015	Stade Jean-Allane, Saint-Benoît, Réunion	Mayotte	1–3	2015 Indian Ocean Island Games (Non-FIFA)
22	2 August 2015	Stade Baby-Larivière, Saint-André, Réunion	Seychelles	2–1	2015 Indian Ocean Island Games
23	4 August 2015	Stade Baby-Larivière, Saint-André, Réunion	Madagascar	0–4	2015 Indian Ocean Island Games
24	3 September 2015	Rizal Memorial Stadium, Manila	Philippines	0–2	International Friendly
25	12 November 2015	National Football Stadium, Malé	Hong Kong	0–1	2018 FIFA World Cup qualification
26	24 December 2015	Trivandrum International Stadium, Thiruvananthapuram	Bhutan	3–1	2015 SAFF Suzuki Cup
27	26 December 2015	Trivandrum International Stadium, Thiruvananthapuram	Bangladesh	3–1	2015 SAFF Suzuki Cup
28	28 December 2015	Trivandrum International Stadium, Thiruvananthapuram	Afghanistan	1–4	2015 SAFF Suzuki Cup
29	31 December 2015	Trivandrum International Stadium, Thiruvananthapuram	India	2–3	2015 SAFF Suzuki Cup
30	11 January 2016	Shamsul Huda Stadium, Jessore	Cambodia	3–2	2016 Bangabandhu Cup
–	14 January 2016	Bangabandhu National Stadium, Dhaka	Bangladesh	2–0	2016 Bangabandhu Cup (Non-FIFA)
–	16 January 2016	Bangabandhu National Stadium, Dhaka	Bahrain	1–1	2016 Bangabandhu Cup (Non-FIFA)
31	19 January 2016	Bangabandhu National Stadium, Dhaka	Nepal	1–4	2016 Bangabandhu Cup
32	24 March 2016		China	0–4	2018 FIFA World Cup qualification
33	29 March 2016		Bhutan	4–2	2018 FIFA World Cup qualification
34	2 June 2016	National Football Stadium, Malé	Yemen	0–2	2019 AFC Asian Cup qualification
35	8 June 2016		Yemen	0–2	2019 AFC Asian Cup qualification
36	1 September 2016	National Football Stadium, Malé	Bangladesh	5–0	International Friendly
37	7 September 2016	National Football Stadium, Malé	Laos	4–0	2019 AFC Asian Cup qualification
38	11 October 2016		Laos	1–1	2019 AFC Asian Cup qualification
39	28 March 2017	National Football Stadium, Malé	Palestine	0–3	2019 AFC Asian Cup qualification
40	6 June 2017	Dubai Sports City Football Academy, Dubai	Afghanistan	1–2	International Friendly
41	13 June 2017	Changlimithang Stadium, Thimphu	Bhutan	2–0	2019 AFC Asian Cup qualification
42	5 September 2017	Sultan Qaboos Sports Complex, Muscat	Oman	0–5	2019 AFC Asian Cup qualification
43	10 October 2017	National Football Stadium, Malé	Oman	1–3	2019 AFC Asian Cup qualification
44	14 November 2017	Arab American University Stadium, Jenin	Palestine	1–8	2019 AFC Asian Cup qualification
45	23 March 2018	National Stadium, Singapore	Singapore	2–3	International Friendly
46	27 March 2018	National Football Stadium, Malé	Bhutan	7–0	2019 AFC Asian Cup qualification
47	7 September 2018	Bangabandhu National Stadium, Dhaka	Sri Lanka	0–0	2018 SAFF Championship
48	9 September 2018	Bangabandhu National Stadium, Dhaka	India	0–2	2018 SAFF Championship
49	12 September 2018	Bangabandhu National Stadium, Dhaka	Nepal	3–0	2018 SAFF Championship
50	15 September 2018	Bangabandhu National Stadium, Dhaka	India	2–1	2018 SAFF Championship Final
51	3 November 2018	Bukit Jalil National Stadium, Kuala Lumpur	Malaysia	0–3	International Friendly
–	18 July 2019	Stade Auguste Vollaire, Centre de Flacq	Réunion	0–4	2019 Indian Ocean Island Games (Non-FIFA)
52	20 July 2019	Stade George V, Curepipe	Comoros	0–3	2019 Indian Ocean Island Games
–	22 July 2019	Stade Auguste Vollaire, Centre de Flacq	Mayotte	1–3	2019 Indian Ocean Island Games (Non-FIFA)
53	14 November 2019	National Football Stadium, Malé	Philippines	1–2	2022 FIFA World Cup qualification
54	19 November 2019	National Football Stadium, Malé	Guam	3–1	2022 FIFA World Cup qualification
55	5 June 2021	Sharjah Stadium, Sharjah	Syria	0–4	2022 FIFA World Cup qualification
56	11 June 2021	Sharjah Stadium, Sharjah	China	0–5	2022 FIFA World Cup qualification
57	15 June 2021	Sharjah Stadium, Sharjah	Philippines	1–1	2022 FIFA World Cup qualification
58	1 October 2021	National Football Stadium, Malé	Nepal	0–1	2021 SAFF Championship
59	7 October 2021	National Football Stadium, Malé	Bangladesh	2–0	2021 SAFF Championship
60	10 October 2021	National Football Stadium, Malé	Sri Lanka	1–0	2021 SAFF Championship
61	13 October 2021	National Football Stadium, Malé	India	1–3	2021 SAFF Championship
62	9 November 2021	Colombo Racecourse, Colombo	Sri Lanka	4–4	2021 Four Nations Football Tournament
63	13 November 2021	Colombo Racecourse, Colombo	Bangladesh	1–2	2021 Four Nations Football Tournament
64	16 November 2021	Colombo Racecourse, Colombo	Seychelles	0–0	2021 Four Nations Football Tournament
65	8 June 2022		Thailand	0–3	2023 AFC Asian Cup qualification
66	11 June 2022		Uzbekistan	0–4	2023 AFC Asian Cup qualification
67	22 June 2023		Bhutan	2–0	2023 SAFF Championship
68	25 June 2023		Bangladesh	1–3	2023 SAFF Championship
69	28 June 2023		Lebanon	0–1	2023 SAFF Championship
70	12 October 2023		Bangladesh	1–1	2026 FIFA World Cup qualification
71	17 October 2023		Bangladesh	1–2	2026 FIFA World Cup qualification
72	13 November 2024		Bangladesh	1–0	International Friendly
73	16 November 2024		Bangladesh	1–2	International Friendly
74	19 March 2025		India	0–3	International Friendly
75	25 March 2025		Philippines	1–4	2027 AFC Asian Cup qualification
76	5 June 2025		Singapore	1–3	International Friendly
77	10 June 2025		Timor-Leste	0–1	2027 AFC Asian Cup qualification
78	6 September 2025		Sri Lanka	3–0	2025 South Asian Super Cup
79	9 September 2025		Sri Lanka	1–1	2025 South Asian Super Cup
80	14 October 2025	National Football Stadium, Malé	Philippines	0–3	2027 AFC Asian Cup qualification

== Awards and honours ==
=== Club ===
Club AYL

- Second Division: Runner-up 2008

New Radiant

- FA Charity Shield: 2013, 2014; Runner-up 2015
- Dhivehi League/Dhivehi Premier League: 2013, 2014, 2015, 2017
- Malé League: 2018
- Maldives FA Cup: 2013, 2017; Runner-up 2014
- President's Cup: 2013, 2014, 2017; Runner-up 2011, 2015

Victory

- Dhivehi League: Runner-up 2012
- President's Cup: Runner-up 2012

TC Sports

- Dhivehi Premier League: Runner-up 2016
- Maldives FA Cup: Runner-up 2016
- President's Cup: Runner-up 2016

Maziya S&RC

- FA Charity Shield: 2023
- President's Cup: 2023

=== International ===
Maldives under-23

- South Asian Games

Bronze: 2010

- MNC Cup

Bronze: 2013

Maldives

- AFC Challenge Cup

Bronze: 2014

- SAFF Championship

Gold: 2018

=== Individual ===
- Haveeru Maldivian Footballer of the year: Runner-up 2014
- New Radiant Excellence Award: 2013
- Maldives Football Awards Best Player: 2016, 2017
- Maldives Football Awards Golden Shoe: 2016 (34 goals), 2017 (24 goals)
- Mihaaru Awards Football Player of the year: 2017; Runner-up 2018
- Mihaaru Awards Golden Shoe: 2017 (24 goals – 47 points)
