= 2014 Maldives FA Cup =

Maldives FA Cup
Tournament details
- Country: Maldives

Final positions
- Champions: Maziya S&RC
- Runner-up: New Radiant SC

The 2014 Maldives FA Cup was the 27th edition of the Maldives FA Cup.

== Quarter-finals ==
| 14 October 2014 | New Radiant SC | 6 – 3 | Mahibadhoo SC | Rasmee Dhandu Stadium, Malé |
| 21:00 | Fasir 20', 33'; David 49', 52'; Akram 50'; Fazeel 68' | Report | 47' Shalim; 76' Junaid; 82' Niyaz |

| 15 October 2014 | Club Eagles | 3 – 0 | BG Sports Club | Rasmee Dhandu Stadium, Malé |
| 21:00 | Easa 8', 20', 81' (pen.) | Report |

| 16 October 2014 | Club All Youth Linkage | 0 – 2 | Club Valencia | Rasmee Dhandu Stadium, Malé |
| 21:00 | | Report | 4' (pen.) Hamdhaan; 80' Mohamed |

| 17 October 2014 | Maziya S&RC | 3 – 1 | TC Sports Club | Rasmee Dhandu Stadium, Malé |
| 21:00 | Ali 5'; Arif 46'; Abdhulla 89' | Report; Sun Report | 71' Isar |

== Semi-finals ==
| 14 November 2014 | New Radiant SC | 1 – 0 | Club Eagles | Rasmee Dhandu Stadium, Malé |
| 21:00 | Umair 70' | Report |

| 15 November 2014 | Club Valencia | 0 – 2 | Maziya S&RC | Rasmee Dhandu Stadium, Malé |
| 21:00 | | Report | 20' Naumov; 28' (pen.) Assadhulla |

== Third-place play-off ==
| 18 November 2014 | Club Eagles | 1 – 2 (a.e.t.) | Club Valencia | Rasmee Dhandu Stadium, Malé |
| 21:00 | Haseeb 90+2' | Report | 61', 119' (pen.) A. Rilwan |

== Final ==
| 19 November 2014 | New Radiant SC | 0 – 0 (a.e.t.) (3 – 4 p) | Maziya S&RC | Rasmee Dhandu Stadium, Malé |
| 21:00 | | Report |
| | Penalties |
| | Fazeel (penalty scored); Akram (penalty scored); Abdulla (penalty missed); Niyaz (penalty missed); Umair (penalty scored) | | (penalty scored) Arif; (penalty missed) Samdhooh; (penalty scored) Ashad; (penalty scored) Assadhulla; (penalty scored) Yaamin |
