= Maldives Football Awards =

Annual association football award since 2016

- Awarded for: Excellence in association football team and individual achievements
- Location: Male', Maldives
- First award: 29 December 2016
- Website: Maldives Football

Maldives Football Awards is an association football award presented annually by MaldivesFootball.com in association with the Football Association of Maldives, since 2016.

The first awarding ceremony was held on 29 December 2016 in Male', Maldives.

== Winners ==
=== Best Men Player ===
Year	Rank	Player	Team
2016	1st	(Maldives) Ali Fasir	(Maldives) TC Sports
2016	2nd	(Maldives) Asadhulla Abdulla	(Maldives) Maziya
2016	3rd	(Maldives) Imran Nasheed	(Maldives) Eagles
2017	1st	(Maldives) Ali Fasir	(Maldives) New Radiant
2017	2nd	(Maldives) Ibrahim Mahudhee	(Maldives) TC Sports
2017	3rd	(Maldives) Ali Ashfaq	(Maldives) New Radiant
2018	1st	(Maldives) Ali Ashfaq	(Maldives) New Radiant
2018	?	(Maldives) Ibrahim Mahudhee	(Maldives) TC Sports
2018	?	(Maldives) Rizwan Ahmed	(Maldives) Eagles

=== Best Foreign Player ===
Year	Rank	Player	Team
2016	Not awarded		
2017	1st	(Spain) Adrián Gallardo Valdés	(Maldives) New Radiant
2017	2nd	(Spain) Candela	(Maldives) New Radiant
2017	3rd	(Saint Vincent and the Grenadines) Cornelius Stewart	(Maldives) TC Sports

=== Best Goalkeeper ===
Year	Rank	Player	Team
2016	Not awarded		
2017	1st	(Maldives) Imran Mohamed	(Maldives) New Radiant
2017	2nd	(Nepal) Kiran Chemjong	(Maldives) TC Sports
2017	3rd	(Syria) Mahmoud Al-Youssef	(Maldives) Victory; Maziya

=== Best Coach ===
Year	Rank	Coach	Team
2016	1st	(Maldives) Mohamed Nizam	(Maldives) TC Sports
2016	2nd	(Maldives) Ali Suzain	(Maldives) Maziya
2016	3rd	(Maldives) Ihsan Abdul Ghani	(Maldives) Eahles
2017	1st	(Spain) Óscar Bruzón	(Maldives) New Radiant
2017	2nd	(Maldives) Mohamed Nizam	(Maldives) TC Sports
2017	3rd	(North Macedonia) Marjan Sekulovski	(Maldives) Maziya

=== Best Supporters' Club ===
Year	Winner
2016	Not awarded
2017	(Maldives) A. A. Maalhos
