= 2017 Maldives FA Cup =

Maldives FA Cup
Tournament details
- Country: Maldives
- Teams: 7

Final positions
- Champions: New Radiant
- Runner-up: TC Sports

Tournament statistics
- Matches played: 7
- Goals scored: 38 (5.43 per match)

The 2017 Maldives FA Cup is the 29th edition of the Maldives FA Cup.

== Quarter finals ==
29 November 2017	Muiveyo Friends	0–3	Maziya	National Football Stadium, Malé
16:00		Report	11' Imaz; 22' Ashad; 45' Samooh

29 November 2017	New Radiant	5–1	Eagles	National Football Stadium, Malé
21:00	Hamza 23'; El-Dor 33', 76'; Adhuham 50'; Fazeel 83'	Report	44' Musannif

30 November 2017	Confere	1–16	Green Streets	National Football Stadium, Malé
16:00	Najih ?'	Report	2', 5', 62', 79' Isham; 14', 42', 65' Ahmed; 29', 40' Nizam; 31', 34', 77' Mukhthar; 45' Nazaam; 54', 74' Yaameen; 68' Shaffaz

== Semi finals ==
2 December 2017	TC Sports	2–0	Maziya	National Football Stadium, Malé
21:00	Mahudhee 68'; Naiz 79'	Report

3 December 2017	New Radiant	4–0	Green Streets	National Football Stadium, Malé
21:00	Fasir 7', 72', 90'; Hamza 46'	Report

== Third place match ==
6 December 2017	Maziya	2–0	Green Streets	National Football Stadium, Malé
16:00	Shameem 30'; Samdhooh 39'	Report

== Final ==
6 December 2017	TC Sports	2–2 (a.e.t.) (2–4 p)	New Radiant	National Football Stadium, Malé
21:00	Stewart 6', 26' (pen.)	Report	50' Fazeel; 75' (pen.) Fasir	Attendance: 1,800; Referee: Xaypaseuth Phongsanit (Laos)
	Penalties
	El-Maghrabi (penalty scored); Stewart (penalty missed); Halil (penalty scored); Ahmed Suhail (penalty missed)		(penalty scored) Fazeel; (penalty scored) Fasir; (penalty missed) El-Dor; (penalty scored) Akram; (penalty scored) Mohamed
