= 2018 SAFF Championship final =

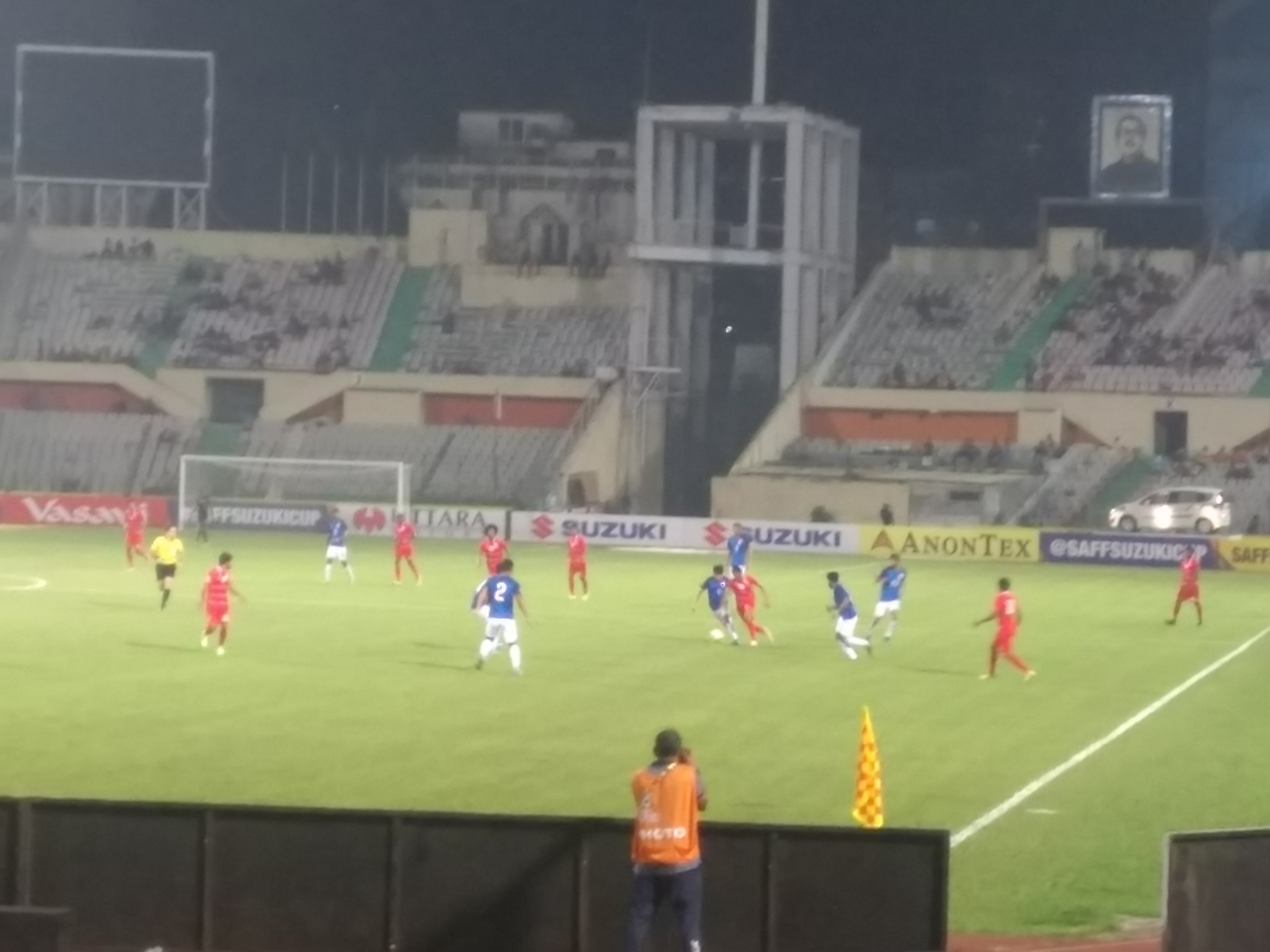
- Event: 2018 SAFF Championship
Maldives	India
2	1
- Date: 15 September 2018
- Venue: Bangabandhu National Stadium, Dhaka
- Referee: Hasan Akrami (Iran)

The 2018 SAFF Championship final was a football match that took place on 15 September 2018 at the Bangabandhu National Stadium, Dhaka. It was announced that the matches during the tournament, including the final, would take place at the Bangabandhu nation stadium, Dhaka. The Maldives came out 2–1 winners against India to secure their second SAFF Championship.

== Venue ==
Dhaka	2018 SAFF Championship final is located in Bangladesh
Bangabandhu National Stadium	2018 SAFF Championship final is located in Bangladesh
Capacity: 36,000	2018 SAFF Championship final is located in Bangladesh

== Route to the final ==
India and Maldives were in the same group alongside Sri Lanka, against whom both these teams played their first match. Maldives were held onto a 0–0 draw by Lankans but India defeated them 2–0. This result left Maldives and Sri Lanka level on points, goal difference, goals against and head-to-head. The place for the semi-final spot was then decided by a coin toss in which Maldives came on top.

In the first semi-final Maldives defeated Nepal 3–0 and in the second semi-final match India defeated their arch-rivals Pakistan by the score of 3–1 to reach the final. India came to this tournament with a young squad missing senior players like Sunil Chhetri and Gurpreet Singh Sandhu as part of preparation for their 2019 AFC Asian Cup campaign.

Maldives
Round
India
Opponent
Result
Group stage
Opponent
Result
Sri Lanka
0–0
Match 1
Sri Lanka
2–0
India
0–2
Match 2
Maldives
2–0

Team	Pld	W	D	L	GF	GA	GD	Pts
India	2	2	0	0	4	0	+4	6
Maldives	2	0	1	1	0	2	-2	1
Sri Lanka	2	0	1	1	0	2	-2	1

Final standings

Team	Pld	W	D	L	GF	GA	GD	Pts
India	2	2	0	0	4	0	+4	6
Maldives	2	0	1	1	0	2	-2	1
Sri Lanka	2	0	1	1	0	2	-2	1

Opponent
Result
Knockout stage
Opponent
Result
Nepal
3–0
Semi-finals
Pakistan
3–1

== Match details ==
15 September 2018
18:30 BST

Maldives	2–1	India
Mahudhee 19'; Fasir 66'	Report	Passi 90+2'

Bangabandhu National Stadium, Dhaka
Referee: Hasan Akrami (Iran)

Maldives	India

GK	22	Mohamed Faisal
CB	4	Hussain Sifaau
CB	2	Ali Samooh
CB	25	Samdhooh Mohamed
RM	10	Hamza Mohamed		(substituted off) 88'
CM	13	Akram Abdul Ghanee (c)		(substituted off) 39'
CM	20	Ibrahim Waheed Hassan
LM	7	Ali Fasir	(yellow card) 67'
AM	23	Hussain Nihan
AM	17	Ibrahim Mahudhee
CF	11	Naiz Hassan		(substituted off) 79'
Substitutions:
DF	3	Ahmed Numaan		(substituted on) 39'
MF	6	Mohamed Arif		(substituted on) 88'
FW	9	Asadhulla Abdulla		(substituted on) 79'
Manager:
(Croatia) Petar Šegrt

GK	1	Vishal Kaith
CB	12	Sarthak Golui
CB	2	Salam Ranjan Singh
CB	14	Vinit Rai
RWB	5	Davinder Singh		(substituted off) 46'
LWB	3	Subhasish Bose (c)	(yellow card) 45+1'
CM	22	Nikhil Poojary
CM	7	Anirudh Thapa		(substituted off) 73'
CM	19	Ashique Kuruniyan
CF	9	Manvir Singh
CF	15	Farukh Choudhary		(substituted off) 68'
Substitutions:
MF	8	Germanpreet Singh		(substituted on) 46'
MF	11	Hitesh Sharma		(substituted on) 73'
FW	10	Sumeet Passi		(substituted on) 68'
Manager:
(England) Stephen Constantine

Assistant referees:
Hossein Ziari (Iran)
Apichit Nophuan (Thailand)
Fourth official:
Sivakorn Pu-udom (Thailand)

Match rules:

- 90 minutes
- 30 minutes of extra time if scores level
- Penalty shoot-out if scores still level
- 12 substitutes named, of which three may be used

== See also ==
- 2018 SAFF Championship
