= 2013 President's Cup (Maldives) =

Tournament details
- Country: Maldives
- Teams: 4

Final positions
- Champions: New Radiant
- Runner-up: Maziya

Tournament statistics
- Matches played: 4
- Goals scored: 18 (4.5 per match)
- Top goal scorer(s): Ali Ashfaq; Mohammad Umair (3 goals each)

The 2013 President's Cup was the 63rd season of the President's Cup, a knock-out competition for Maldives' top 4 football clubs. New Radiant Sports Club were the defending champions, having beaten Victory Sports Club in last season's final on penalty shoot-out.

The final was held on 23 October 2012, in which New Radiant won the final 4-2 on extra time, claiming a record tenth President's Cup, after the scores were 2-2 at the end of normal time.

== Background ==
=== Broadcasting rights ===
The broadcasting rights for all the matches of 2013 Maldives President's Cup were given to the Television Maldives.

== Qualifier ==
Top 4 teams after the end of 2013 Dhivehi League third round will be qualified for the President's Cup.

Pos	Team	Pld	W	D	L	GF	GA	GD	Pts	Qualification or relegation
1	New Radiant	19	19	0	0	73	5	+68	57	President's Cup
2	Maziya	19	12	1	6	38	18	+20	37	President's Cup
3	BG Sports Club	19	7	3	9	19	23	−4	24	President's Cup
4	Club All Youth Linkage	19	7	3	9	15	34	−19	24	President's Cup
5	Club Valencia	19	6	4	9	22	29	−7	22	
6	Club Eagles	19	4	5	10	17	37	−20	17	

Updated to match(es) played on 28 July 2013. Source: RSSSF.com
Rules for classification: 1) points; 2) goal difference; 3) number of goals scored.

== Final qualifier ==
8 October 2013
21:00

New Radiant	3-1	Maziya
Ashfaq 56', 90+3'; Umair 88'	Report	61' Arif

Rasmee Dhandu Stadium, Malé

== Semi-final qualifier ==
9 October 2013
21:00

BG Sports Club	3-2	Club All Youth Linkage
Shaffaz 27', 72'; Fazeel 57'	Report	1' Ajuwad; 66' Muaz

Rasmee Dhandu Stadium, Malé

== Semi-final ==
13 October 2013
21:00

Maziya	2-1	BG Sports Club
Ahmed 83' (pen.); Assadhulla 84'	Report	Solah 43'

Rasmee Dhandu Stadium, Malé

== Final ==
23 October 2013
21:00 UTC+5

New Radiant	4–2 (a.e.t.)	Maziya
Umair 5' (pen.), 65'; Ashfaq 107'; H. Niyaz 119'	Report	30' Assadhulla; 71' Rumen

Rasmee Dhandu Stadium, Malé

== Statistics ==
=== Scorers ===
Rank	Player	Club	Goals
1	(Maldives) Ali Ashfaq	New Radiant	2
1	(Maldives) Mohammad Umair	New Radiant	2
2	(Maldives) Assadhulla Abdulla	Maziya	2
2	(Maldives) Mohamed Shaffaz	BG Sports Club	2
3	(Bulgaria) Rumen Georgiev Aleksandrov	Maziya	1
3	(Maldives) Hussain Niyaz Mohamed	New Radiant	1
3	(Maldives) Mohamed Arif	Maziya	1
3	(Maldives) Solah	BG Sports Club	1
3	(Maldives) Ahmed Mohamed	Maziya	1
3	(Maldives) Ahmed Ajuwad	Club AYL	1
3	(Maldives) Abdulla Muaz	Club AYL	1
3	(Maldives) Ibrahim Fazeel	BG Sports Club	1

=== Assists ===
Rank	Player	Club	Assists
1	(Maldives) Ibrahim Shiyaam	Maziya	1
1	(Maldives) Akram Abdul Ghanee	New Radiant	1
1	(Maldives) Ahmed Mohamed	Maziya	1
1	(Maldives) Ali Fasir	New Radiant	1
1	(Sierra Leone) Abu Desmond Mansaray	Club AYL	1
1	(Maldives) Ahmed Nashid	Maziya	1
1	(Maldives) Mohammad Umair	New Radiant	1
