= 2012 President's Cup (Maldives) =

Tournament details
- Country: Maldives
- Teams: 4

Final positions
- Champions: New Radiant
- Runners-up: Victory

Tournament statistics
- Matches played: 4
- Top goal scorer(s): Ahmed Rasheed (3 goals)

The 2012 President's Cup was the 62nd season of the President's Cup, a knock-out competition for Maldives' top 4 football clubs. Victory Sports Club were the defending champions, having beaten New Radiant Sports Club 2–1 in last season's Final.

The winner of the competition will qualify for the qualifying play-off of the 2013 AFC Cup. The final was held on the 15 October 2012, and was contested at Rasmee Dhandu Stadium between the same finalists of the previous season, New Radiant and Victory. New Radiant won the final 2–1 on penalties, claiming a record ninth President's Cup, after the score was 0-0 after extra time.

The broadcasting rights for all the matches of 2012 Maldives President's Cup were given to the Television Maldives.

== Final qualifier ==
8 October 2012
15:50

New Radiant	2–1 (a.e.t.)	Victory
Ashfaq 100' (pen.); Imran 112'	Report	Fauzan 118'

Rasmee Dhandu Stadium, Malé

== Semi-final qualifier ==
9 October 2012
21:00

Maziya	6–2	VB Addu FC
Ahmed 30', 90+4'; Shiyam 45'; Amdhaan 58'; Niyaz 60', 68'	Report	Fazeeh 79'; Nafiu 90+1'

Rasmee Dhandu Stadium, Malé

== Semi-final ==
12 October 2012
21:00

Victory Sports Club	3–2	Maziya
Umair 18' (pen.), 51'; Akram 77'	Report	Rilwan 9' (o.g.); Ahmed 63'

Rasmee Dhandu Stadium, Malé

== Final ==
The final was played on 15 October 2012 at Rasmee Dhandu Stadium. The final involved one team from the Dhivehi League, New Radiant and Victory. The game was won by New Radiant after a penalty shoot-out.

15 October 2012
21:15 UTC+5

New Radiant	0–0	Victory
	Report
Penalties
Fazeel (penalty scored); Kelani (penalty missed); A. Abdulla (penalty missed); Niyaz (penalty scored)	2–1	(penalty missed) Akram; (penalty scored) Umair; (penalty missed) Shafiu; (penalty missed) Fasir; (penalty missed) Rilwan

Rasmee Dhandu Stadium, Malé

== Statistics ==
=== Scorers ===
Rank	Player	Club	Goals
1	(Maldives) Ahmed Rasheed	Maziya	3
2	(Maldives) Hussain Niyaz Mohamed	Maziya	2
2	(Maldives) Mohamed Umair	Victory	2
3	(Maldives) Ali Ashfaq	New Radiant	1
3	(Maldives) Imran Mohamed	New Radiant	1
3	(Maldives) Fauzan Habeeb	Victory	1
3	(Maldives) Ibrahim Shiyam	Maziya	1
3	(Maldives) Amdhaan Ali	Maziya	1
3	(Maldives) Adam Fazeeh	VB Addu FC	1
3	(Maldives) Ali Nafiu	VB Addu FC	1
3	(Maldives) Akram Abdul Ghanee	Victory	1

=== Assists ===
Rank	Player	Club	Assists
1	(Maldives) Ahmed Rasheed	Maziya	2
2	(Maldives) Akram Abdul Ghanee	Victory	1
2	(Maldives) Ahmed Mohamed	Maziya	1
2	(Maldives) Hussain Niyaz Mohamed	Maziya	1
2	(Sierra Leone) Abu Desmond Mansaray	VB Addu FC	1
2	(Maldives) Ismail Easa	Maziya	1

Own goals

- (Maldives) Rilwan Waheed (Victory) (playing against Maziya)
