= 2012 President's Cup =

2012 President's Cup may refer to:

- 2012 President's Cup (Maldives), football
- 2012 President's Cup (tennis)
