= 2014 President's Cup (Maldives) =

2014 Maldives President's Cup
Tournament details
- Country: Maldives
- Teams: 4

Final positions
- Champions: New Radiant Sports Club

Tournament statistics
- Matches played: 4

The 2014 President's Cup was the 64th season of the President's Cup, a knock-out competition for Maldives' top 4 football clubs. New Radiant Sports Club were the defending champions, having beaten Maziya in last season's final in extra time.

The final was held on 30 November 2014, in which New Radiant won 1-0 on extra time from a long range shot from Ali Fasir claiming a record eleventh President's Cup and winning the title for the third time in a row.

== Background ==
=== Broadcasting rights ===
The broadcasting rights for all the matches of 2013 Maldives President's Cup were given to the Television Maldives.

== Qualifier ==
The top 4 teams after the end of the 2014 Dhivehi League third round were qualified for the President's Cup.

== Final qualifier ==
23 November 2014
21:00

New Radiant	2–1	Maziya
David 14'; Hamza 22'	Report	39' Assadhulla

National Football Stadium, Malé

== Semi-final qualifier ==
24 November 2014
21:00

Club Eagles	1–0	Victory Sports Club
Easa 57' (pen.)	Report

National Football Stadium, Malé

== Semi-final ==
27 November 2014
21:00

Maziya	1–4	Club Eagles
Assadhulla 37'	Report	11' Easa; 25' Sameeh; 48' Imran N. 83' Imaaz

National Football Stadium, Malé

== Final ==
30 November 2014
21:00 UTC+5

New Radiant	1–0	Club Eagles
Ali Fasir 106'	Report

National Football Stadium, Malé

== Statistics ==
=== Scorers ===
Rank	Player	Club	Goals
1	(Maldives) Ismail Easa	Club Eagles	2
1	(Maldives) Assadhulla Abdulla	Maziya	2
2	(Maldives) Ali Fasir	New Radiant	1
2	(Spain) Escobedo Carmona Manuel David	New Radiant	1
2	(Maldives) Hamza Mohamed	New Radiant	1
2	(Maldives) Abdulla Sameeh Moosa	Club Eagles	1
2	(Maldives) Ahmed Imaaz	Club Eagles	1

=== Assists ===
Rank	Player	Club	Assists
1	(Maldives) Moosa Yaamin	Maziya	2
2	(Maldives) Mohammad Umair	New Radiant	1
2	(Maldives) Akram Abdul Ghanee	New Radiant	1
2	(Maldives) Ibrahim Mubeen Ahmed Rasheed	Club Eagles	1
