= Ali Suzain =

Maldivian footballer and manager

Personal information
- Full name: Ali Suzain
- Date of birth: 11 October
- Place of birth: Malé, Maldives

Team information
- Current team: Maldives (Head Coach)

Senior career*
Years	Team	Apps	(Gls)
- Victory
- Valencia

Managerial career
- 2002–2008: Victory (Assistant coach)
- 2009–2012: Victory
- 2013: Maldives U23
- 2014–2016: Maziya
- 2017: Victory
- 2017: G. Dh. Thinadhoo
- 2018–2020: Green Streets
- 2020–2021: Maldives (assistant)
- 2021: Maldives
- 2023–2024: Maldives
- 2025–: New Radiant
- * Club domestic league appearances and goals

Ali Suzain (born 11 October 1969) is a Maldivian football coach, and former player. He is currently the head coach of New Radiant.

== Honours ==
=== Assistant coach ===
Victory

- Cup Winners' Cup: 2002, 2006
- Malé League: 2003, 2006
- Dhivehi League: 2007
- National Championship/Presidents's Cup: 2002, 2003, 2005, 2006

=== Coach ===
Coaching career 1993 1994 coach of Alifushi Zuvaanunge Jamiyyaa / Champions Raa Atoll 1994 coach SC Elite 3rd Division / Champions 1995 Dhandimagu ZJ zone final round 1995 SC Elite 2nd Division / Champions 1997 1998 coach Hoadhadu ZJ FVM Atoll & Zone tournament 1999 coach club Eagles Cup winners cup 2001 2002 player & assistant coach Victory SC 2003 2004 Coach Victory SC

Victory

- FA Cup: 2009, 2010
- President's Cup: 2009, 2011

Maziya

- Dhivehi Premier League: 2016
- President's Cup: 2015
- FA Cup: 2014
- Charity Shield: 2015, 2016
