= 2013 Dhivehi League =

Dhivehi League
- Season: 2013
- Champions: New Radiant SC; 3rd Dhivehi League title
- AFC Cup: New Radiant SC
- Matches: 19
- Goals: 207 (10.89 per match)
- Top goalscorer: Ali Ashfaq
- Highest scoring: New Radiant 10–0 Club AYL (30 June 2013); New Radiant 10–1 VB Addu FC (26 February 2013)
- Longest winning run: 19 games New Radiant
- Longest unbeaten run: 19 games New Radiant
- Longest winless run: 7 games Club AYL; VB Addu FC

The 2013 Dhivehi League(a Maldivian football association) started on 26 February 2013 and ended on 28 July 2013.

== League table ==
Format: In Round 1 and Round 2, all eight teams play against each other. The top six teams after Round 2 play against each other in Round 3. The teams with the most total points after Round 3 are crowned the Dhivehi League champions and qualify for the AFC Cup. The top four teams qualify for the President's Cup. The bottom two teams after Round 2 play against the top two teams of the Second Division in Dhivehi League Qualification for places in the next year's Dhivehi League.

=== Standings of round 1 ===
Pos	Team	Pld	W	D	L	GF	GA	GD	Pts
1	New Radiant SC	7	7	0	0	31	3	+28	21
2	Maziya S&RC	7	4	0	3	13	9	+4	12
3	Club Valencia	7	4	0	3	13	12	+1	12
4	BG Sports Club	7	4	0	3	9	8	+1	12
5	Club Eagles	7	2	2	3	9	10	−1	8
6	VB Addu FC	7	2	2	3	7	17	−10	8
7	Victory SC	7	2	1	4	6	14	−8	7
8	Club All Youth Linkage	7	0	1	6	0	15	−15	1

Rules for classification: 1) points; 2) goal difference; 3) number of goals scored.

=== Standings of round 2 ===
Pos	Team	Pld	W	D	L	GF	GA	GD	Pts
1	New Radiant SC	7	7	0	0	20	1	+19	21
2	Maziya S&RC	7	5	1	1	17	5	+12	16
3	Club All Youth Linkage	7	4	2	1	10	7	+3	14
4	Club Valencia	7	2	3	2	8	9	−1	9
5	Club Eagles	5	1	1	3	6	14	−8	4
6	BG Sports Club	7	1	2	4	5	10	−5	5
7	Victory SC	7	1	2	4	4	13	−9	5
8	VB Addu FC	7	0	1	6	6	17	−11	1

Rules for classification: 1) points; 2) goal difference; 3) number of goals scored.

=== Standings of round 3 ===
Pos	Team	Pld	W	D	L	GF	GA	GD	Pts
1	New Radiant SC	5	5	0	0	22	1	+21	15
2	Maziya S&RC	5	3	0	2	8	4	+4	9
3	All Youth Linkage	5	3	0	2	5	12	−7	9
4	BG Sports	5	2	1	2	5	5	0	7
5	Club Eagles	5	1	0	4	2	13	−11	3
6	Club Valencia	5	1	0	4	1	8	−7	3

Rules for classification: 1) points; 2) goal difference; 3) number of goals scored.

=== Final standing ===
Pos	Team	Pld	W	D	L	GF	GA	GD	Pts	Qualification or relegation
1	New Radiant SC (C)	19	19	0	0	73	5	+68	57	2014 AFC Cup
2	Maziya	19	12	1	6	38	18	+20	37	2014 Dhivehi League
3	BG Sports	19	7	3	9	19	23	−4	24	2014 Dhivehi League
4	All Youth Linkage	19	7	3	9	15	34	−19	24	2014 Dhivehi League
5	Club Valencia	19	6	4	9	22	29	−7	22	2014 Dhivehi League
6	Eagles	19	4	5	10	17	37	−20	17	2014 Dhivehi League
7	Victory SC	14	3	3	8	10	27	−17	12	Promotion/relegation playoff
8	VB (R)	14	2	3	9	13	34	−21	9	Promotion/relegation playoff

Updated to match(es) played on 24 June 2013. Source: RSSSF.com
Rules for classification: 1) points; 2) goal difference; 3) number of goals scored.
(C) Champions; (R) Relegated

== Promotion/relegation playoff ==
Pos	Team	Pld	W	D	L	GF	GA	GD	Pts	Qualification or relegation
1	Mahibadhoo (P)	3	2	1	0	15	3	+12	7	2014 Dhivehi League
2	Victory	3	2	0	1	8	6	+2	6	2014 Dhivehi League
3	VB Addu (R)	3	1	1	1	7	6	+1	4	2014 Maldives Second Division
4	Mecano	3	0	0	3	2	17	−15	0	2014 Maldives Second Division

Updated to match(es) played on 12 July 2013. Source: RSSSF.com
Rules for classification: 1) points; 2) goal difference; 3) number of goals scored.
(P) Promoted; (R) Relegated

=== Matches ===
29 June 2013 1	VB Addu	1 – 1	Mahibadhoo	Rasmee Dhandu Stadium, Malé
		Report

30 June 2013 2	Victory	3 – 0	Mecano	Rasmee Dhandu Stadium, Malé
		Report

3 July 2013 3	VB Addu	4 – 2	Mecano	Rasmee Dhandu Stadium, Malé
		Report

4 July 2013 4	Victory	2 – 4	Mahibadhoo	Rasmee Dhandu Stadium, Malé
		Report

11 July 2013 5	Mecano	0 – 10	Mahibadhoo	Rasmee Dhandu Stadium, Malé

12 July 2013 6	Victory	3 – 2	VB Addu	Rasmee Dhandu Stadium, Malé
	Hussain Simaz 5'; Ibrahim Shafraz 68'; Chinda Chizi Kaka (??)	Report (in Dhivehi)	24' Imran Nasheed; 74' Abdulla Haneef

=== Scorers ===
Rank	Player	Club	Goals
1	(Maldives) Ali Ashfaq	New Radiant SC	9
1	(Maldives) Ahmed Rasheed	Maziya S&RC	9
1	(Maldives) Mohamed Umair	Victory Sports Club	9
2	(Sierra Leone) Abu Desmond Mansaray	VB Addu FC	6
3	(Benin) Salomon Wisdom	Club Valencia	5
3	(Maldives) Ahmed Thoriq	New Radiant SC	5
3	(Maldives) Ibrahim Hamdhaan	Club Valencia	5
4	(Maldives) Ahmed Imaz	Club Eagles	4
4	(Maldives) Ibrahim Fazeel	New Radiant SC	4
4	(Maldives) Assadhulla Abdulla	Maziya S&RC	4
4	(Maldives) Assad Abdul Ghanee	Club Eagles	4
