= Zhivko Dinev =

Bulgarian footballer

Personal information
- Full name: Zhivko Todorov Dinev
- Date of birth: 30 July 1987 (age 39)
- Place of birth: Sliven, Bulgaria
- Height: 1.79 m (5 ft 10 in)
- Positions: Centre-back; defensive midfielder

Team information
- Current team: Einherji

Youth career
- Sliven 2000

Senior career*
Years	Team	Apps	(Gls)
2005–2010	Sliven 2000	77	(2)
2010–2011	Onisilos Sotira	30	(4)
2011–2012	Sliven 2000	23	(0)
2012	Kaliakra Kavarna	12	(1)
2013	Club Valencia	10	(0)
2013–2016	Maziya	61	(3)
2017	Nesebar	10	(0)
2017–2019	Einherji	20	(0)
2019	Fjarðabyggðar	0	(0)
2019–	Einherji	3	(0)

International career
	Bulgaria U17	3	(0)
	Bulgaria U19	4	(0)
- * Club domestic league appearances and goals as of 12:35, 31 May 2019 (UTC)

Zhivko Dinev (Bulgarian: Живко Динев; born 30 July 1987) is a Bulgarian footballer who plays as a central defender for Einherji.

== Career ==
Dinev was raised in Sliven's youth teams. In 2005, he agreed to his first professional contract, a five-year deal with Sliven. On 14 August 2005, as an 18-year-old, he made his debut for the first team squad in a match of the B PFG against Nesebar.

== Career statistics ==
As of 1 June 2012

Club	Season	League		Cup		Total	
Club	Season	Apps	Goals	Apps	Goals	Apps	Goals
Sliven	2005–06	22	1	1	0	23	1
Sliven	2006–07	20	0	2	0	22	0
Sliven	2007–08	12	1	1	0	13	1
Sliven	2008–09	12	0	0	0	12	0
Sliven	2009–10	11	0	0	0	11	0
Sliven	2011–12	23	0	0	0	23	0
Career totals		100	2	4	0	104	2
