= Samdhooh Mohamed =

Maldivian footballer

Personal information
- Full name: Ali Samdhooh Mohamed
- Date of birth: 29 September 1991 (age 35)
- Place of birth: Kudafaree, Maldives
- Height: 1.77 m (5 ft 9 1/2 in)
- Position: Full-back

Team information
- Current team: Maziya S&RC
- Number: 13

Senior career*
Years	Team	Apps	(Gls)
–2011	Club All Youth Linkage		
2012–	Maziya		

International career^{‡}
- Maldives U19
–2014	Maldives U23		
2011–	Maldives	16	(0)
- * Club domestic league appearances and goals ‡ National team caps and goals as of 19 November 2019

Ali Samdhooh Mohamed (born 29 September 1991) is a Maldivian footballer, who is currently playing for Maziya.

== Club career ==
Samdhooh started playing at Club All Youth Linkage until 2011, and he was also the captain of the team in the 2011 season. He left Club AYL to join Maziya for the 2012 season.

== International career ==
Samdhooh was first called up for the senior national team side, for the preparation of 2012 AFC Challenge Cup qualification on 2 March 2011, at the age of 19 by coach Andrés Cruciani, but he did not make it to the final 20 men squad.

Samdhooh made his international debut in a friendly match against Singapore on 7 June 2011, replacing Akram Abdul Ghanee in the 70th minute, where they lost the match 4–0.

Samdhooh was again called up for an international duty for a friendly against Tajikistan by coach Velizar Popov on 12 March 2015, and replaced Shafiu Ahmed in the 74th minute at the National football stadium where they lost the match 2–0 to Tajikistan on 26 March 2015.

== Honours ==
Maldives

- SAFF Championship: 2018
