= Ahmed Rasheed (footballer) =

Maldivian footballer

Personal information
- Date of birth: 8 July 1988 (age 38)
- Place of birth: Maldives
- Position: Forward

Team information
- Current team: Green Streets

Senior career*
Years	Team	Apps	(Gls)
2005–2007	Eagles		
2008–2013	Maziya		(66)
2014–	Eagles		
- Mazya
2018	Victory Sports Club		
2019–	Green Streets		

International career
2009–2017	Maldives	17	(1)
- * Club domestic league appearances and goals as of 31 March 2014

Ahmed Rasheed (born 7 July 1988) is a Maldivian footballer, who has played for Club Eagles as a forward.

== International career ==
Rasheed made his debut for the Maldives' senior team in their first match of the 2012 Nehru Cup against Nepal on 23 August 2012, coming on to play in the 63rd minute, replacing his club teammate Assadhulla Abdulla. He also assisted the goal scored by Ismail Easa to increase the lead for his side to 2 goals.

== Career statistics ==
=== International ===
Appearances and goals by national team and year
National team	Year	Apps	Goals
Maldives	2009	2	0
Maldives	2010	–	
Maldives	2011	5	0
Maldives	2012	2	1
Maldives	2013	6	0
Maldives	2014	–	
Maldives	2015	–	
Maldives	2016	–	
Maldives	2017	2	0
Total		17	1

Scores and results list the Maldives' goal tally first, score column indicates score after each Rasheed goal.

List of international goals scored by Ahmed Rasheed
No.	Date	Venue	Opponent	Score	Result	Competition
1	17 August 2012	Jawaharlal Nehru Stadium, New Delhi, India	Yemen	2–1	2–1	2012 Nehru Cup
