= Abu Desmond Mansaray =

Sierra Leonean footballer

Abu Mansaray
Personal information
- Full name: Abu Desmond Mansaray
- Date of birth: 25 September 1984 (age 42)
- Place of birth: Sierra Leone
- Height: 1.83 m (6 ft 0 in)
- Position: Forward

Senior career*
| Years | Team | Apps | (Gls) |
| 2009–2013 | VB Sports | | |
| 2013 | Club All Youth Linkage | 26 | (13) |
| 2014 | Maziya S&RC | 26 | (8) |
| 2015 | Club Eagles | 14 | (1) |
- Club Zefrol
- * Club domestic league appearances and goals

Abu Desmond Mansaray (born 25 September 1984) is a Sierra Leonean footballer who plays for Club Zefrol in the Maldives. He is described as good at dribbling and crossing into the box.

== Career ==
Following a 3–2 defeat to Indonesian team Arema Malang in the 2014 AFC Cup, Mansaray encapsulated his side's performance in two sentences by saying that they tried hard and lost because they were not lucky enough.

Won the 2017 edition of the Maldives Second Division with Club Zefrol, scoring a goal in the final.

During his stay with VB Sports, the striker put in a string of solid performances for the club, including a hat-trick in a 6–3 victory over Club Eagles in 2012.
