= Ahmed Nashid =

Maldivian footballer

Personal information
- Full name: Ahmed Nashid
- Date of birth: 4 April 1989 (age 37)
- Place of birth: Maldives
- Position: Forward

Team information
- Current team: VB Addu FC
- Number: 22

Senior career*
Years	Team	Apps	(Gls)
2008	Maradhoo Island Community		
2008–2010	Club Valencia		
2011–2012	VB Addu FC	23	(11)
2013–2016	Maziya S&RC		
2017	Club Eagles		
2018	Victory Sports Club		
2019–	United Victory		

International career^{‡}
2010	Maldives U23	2	(0)
2012–	Maldives	25	(5)
- * Club domestic league appearances and goals ‡ National team caps and goals as of 27 January 2017

Ahmed Nashid (born 4 April 1989) is a Maldivian footballer nicknamed "Naattey", who is currently playing for VB Addu FC.

== International career ==
Nashid made his debut for the Maldives' senior team in a friendly match against Pakistan on 12 February 2013, coming on to play in the 65th minute, replacing Rilwan Waheed.

=== International goals ===
Scores and results list Maldives' goal tally first.

Goal	Date	Venue	Opponent	Score	Result	Competition
1.	8 October 2015	Changlimithang Stadium, Thimphu, Bhutan	Bhutan	1–0	4–3	2018 FIFA World Cup qualification
2.	26 December 2015	Trivandrum International Stadium, Thiruvananthapuram, India	Bangladesh	3–1	3–1	2015 SAFF Championship
3.	31 December 2015	Trivandrum International Stadium, Thiruvananthapuram, India	India	1–2	2–3	2015 SAFF Championship
4.	19 January 2016	Bangabandhu National Stadium, Dhaka, Bangladesh	Nepal	3–1	3–1	Friendly
5.	11 October 2016	New Laos National Stadium, Vientiane, Laos	Laos	1–1	1–1	2019 AFC Asian Cup qualification
