= Mohamed Rasheed (footballer) =

Maldivian footballer

Personal information
- Full name: Mohamed Rasheed
- Date of birth: 15 April 1985 (age 41)
- Place of birth: Alifushi, Maldives
- Positions: Defender; midfielder; winger

Team information
- Current team: Odi Sports
- Number: 19

Senior career*
Years	Team	Apps	(Gls)
2009	New Radiant	1	(0)
2010–2012	Victory	32	(0)
2013	Valencia	9	(0)
2013	Maziya	5	(0)
2014–2018	New Radiant	54	(3)
2019–2020	Da Grande	19	(0)
2020–2022	Super United	13	(1)
2023–	Odi	5	(0)

International career
2012–2017	Maldives	31	(1)
- * Club domestic league appearances and goals

Mohamed Rasheed (born 15 April 1985) is a Maldivian footballer, nicknamed "Hokey", who is currently playing for Odi Sports Club.

== International career ==
Mohamed made his debut in a friendly match against Thailand on February 24, 2012.

=== 2012 AFC Challenge Cup ===
He played all the matches in the 2012 AFC Challenge Cup for the Maldives. He used to play as a left back at the club level, but the coach István Urbányi used him as a left wing forward. As a result, he scored his first goal for the Red Snappers in the 1–0 win against Nepal on March 10, 2012.

== Career statistics ==
=== International goals ===
==== Senior team ====
#	Date	Venue	Opponent	Score	Result	Competition
1.	10 March 2012	Dasarath Rangasala Stadium, Kathmandu	Nepal	1–0	1–0	2012 AFC Challenge Cup

== Awards and honours ==
=== Club ===
Victory

- FA Cup: 2010
- President's Cup: 2011

New Radiant

- Dhivehi League: 2014
- Dhivehi Premier League: 2015, 2017, 2018
- Malé League: 2018
- President's Cup: 2014, 2017
- FA Cup: 2017
- Charity Shield: 2014

Odi Sports CLub

- Second Division: 2023–24
- President's Cup: 2026
