= Imran Nasheed =

Maldivian footballer

Personal information
- Full name: Imran Nasheed
- Date of birth: 14 August 1988 (age 38)
- Place of birth: Maldives
- Position: Midfielder

Team information
- Current team: Eagles
- Number: 6

Senior career*
Years	Team	Apps	(Gls)
2007–2011	Club AYL		
2012	Vyansa		
2013	VB Addu		
2014–	Eagles		
2017	→ G. Dh. Thinadhoo (loan)		

International career^{‡}
2016–	Maldives	9	(0)
- * Club domestic league appearances and goals ‡ National team caps and goals as of 15 June 2021

Imran Nasheed (born 14 August 1988) is a Maldivian professional footballer who plays as a midfielder for G. Dh. Thinadhoo, on loan from Eagles.

== International ==
Imran made his Maldives national football team debut against Yemen in the 2019 AFC Asian Cup qualification play-off.
