= Mohamed Sifan =

Maldivian footballer

Personal information
- Full name: Mohamed Sifan
- Date of birth: 8 March 1983 (age 43)
- Place of birth: Eydhafushi, Maldives
- Positions: Defensive midfielder; centre midfielder

Team information
- Current team: New Radiant SC
- Number: 3

Senior career*
| Years | Team | Apps | (Gls) |
| –2008 | New Radiant SC | | |
| 2009–2012 | Victory | 64 | (3) |
| 2013– | New Radiant SC | 1 | (0) |

International career
| | Maldives | | (1) |
- * Club domestic league appearances and goals

Mohamed Sifan (born 8 March 1983) is a Maldivian footballer, nicknamed "Kudattey", who currently plays for New Radiant SC. He also plays for the Maldives national football team. He is from the island of Eydhafushi, Baa Atoll.

== International goals ==
Scores and results list Maldives' goal tally first.

| Date | Venue | Opponent | Score | Result | Competition |
|---|---|---|---|---|---|
| 3 June 2008 | Rasmee Dhandu Stadium, Malé | Pakistan | 1–0 | 3–0 | 2008 SAFF Championship |

== Honours ==
Maldives

- SAFF Championship: 2008
