= Moosa Yaamin =

Maldivian footballer

Personal information
- Date of birth: 29 December 1992 (age 33)
- Place of birth: Maldives
- Height: 1.80 m (5 ft 11 in)
- Position: Midfielder

Team information
- Current team: Maziya
- Number: 23

Youth career
- 2012: Club All Youth Linkage

Senior career*
Years	Team	Apps	(Gls)
2010	Thoddoo FC	14	(0)
2011–2012	Club All Youth Linkage	29	(0)
2013	New Radiant		
2014–	Maziya		

International career^{‡}
2012	Maldives U23	9	(0)
2012–	Maldives	2	(0)
- * Club domestic league appearances and goals as of 31 March 2014 ‡ National team caps and goals as of 31 March 2014

Moosa Yaamin (born 29 December 1992) is a Maldivian footballer, who is currently playing for New Radiant.

== Club career ==
=== Thoddoo FC ===
Yaamin made his debut for Thoddoo FC at the age of 17 where they lost 3–0 to Victory in a Dhivehi League match on 11 April 2010, coming in to play in the starting of the second half as a substitute. He was also cautioned with a yellow card for the foul against Mukhthar Naseer inside the penalty area, awarding a penalty for Victory. He started his first game for his club in their Dhivehi League's 2–1 loss against Maziya on 18 April 2010. On 6 May 2010, he played the match, lasting on the pitch for full 90 minutes in the 2–0 win against Vyansa.

=== Club All Youth Linkage ===
Yaamin made his Dhivehi League debut for AYL on 2 April 2011, starting in a 2–0 win against Vyansa. He played his first match lasting 90 minutes for AYL, in the following 3–1 loss in the Dhivehi League against New Radiant on 9 April 2011.

In his first ever FA Cup campaign, he made his debut in the quarter finals against VB Addu FC on 11 September 2012. The match ended as a 2–2 draw in the full-time, and both sides couldn't find a winner in the extra time. They surprisingly beat the Champions 4–2 in the Penalty shoot-out, Yaamin hitting the net with the ball in the deciding penalty and advancing his side to the semi finals.

== International career ==
Yaamin made his debut in the Maldives' last match of 2012 Nehru Cup, in which they lost 3–1 to Cameroon on 29 August 2012, coming on to play in the 80th minute, replacing Assadhulla Abdulla.

== Career statistics ==
=== Club ===
As of match played 27 September 2012

Season	Club	Division	League			FA Cup			President's Cup			Charity Shield			Asia			Total			Discipline	
Season	Club	Division	Apps	Goals	Assists	Apps	Goals	Assists	Apps	Goals	Assists	Apps	Goals	Assists	Apps	Goals	Assists	Apps	Goals	Assists	A yellow card	A red card
2010	Thoddoo	Dhivehi League	14	0	0	0	0	0	0	0	0	0	0	0	0	0	0	14	0	0	1	0
Thoddoo total			14	0	0	0	0	0	0	0	0	0	0	0	0	0	0	14	0	0	1	0
2011	Club AYL	Dhivehi League	12	0	0	0	0	0	0	0	0	0	0	0	0	0	0	12	0	0	0	0
2012	Club AYL	Dhivehi League	15	0	0	1	0	0	0	0	0	0	0	0	0	0	0	16	0	0	1	0
Club AYL total			27	0	0	1	0	0	0	0	0	0	0	0	0	0	0	28	0	0	1	0
Career total			43	0	0	1	0	0	0	0	0	0	0	0	0	0	0	44	0	0	2	0
