= Shafiu Ahmed =

Maldivian footballer

Shafiu Ahmed (Shaafee)
Personal information
- Full name: Shafiu Ahmed
- Date of birth: 16 March 1987 (age 39)
- Place of birth: Eydhafushi, Maldives
- Position: Defender

Team information
- Current team: Valencia
- Number: 26

Senior career*
Years	Team	Apps	(Gls)
–2010	Valencia		(2)
2010–2012	Victory		
2013	Maziya		
2014–2015	New Radiant		
2016–	Valencia		
2017	→ Green Streets (loan)		(1)

International career
- Maldives U-23
2011–	Maldives	16	(0)
- * Club domestic league appearances and goals

Shafiu "Shaafee" Ahmed (born 16 March 1987) is a Maldivian international footballer. Shaafee is also a player of Maldives national football team. He is from the island of Eydhafushi, Baa Atoll.
