= Ahmed Abdulla (Maldivian footballer) =

Maldivian footballer

Personal information
- Full name: Ahmed Abdulla
- Date of birth: 11 March 1987 (age 39)
- Place of birth: Hinnavaru, Maldives
- Height: 1.72 m (5 ft 8 in)
- Position: Defender

Team information
- Current team: Maziya
- Number: 44

Senior career*
Years	Team	Apps	(Gls)
????–2008	Sports Club Velloxia		
2009–2015	New Radiant SC	104	(6)
2016	T.C. Sports Club		
2017–2018	New Radiant SC		
2019–	Maziya		

International career^{‡}
2009–	Maldives	30	(1)
- * Club domestic league appearances and goals ‡ National team caps and goals as of 14 June 2017

Ahmed Abdulla (born 11 March 1987), nicknamed Lily is a Maldivian professional footballer who plays for New Radiant SC and Maldives national team.

== International career ==
=== International goals ===
Scores and results list Maldives' goal tally first.

No	Date	Venue	Opponent	Score	Result	Competition
1.	13 June 2017	Changlimithang Stadium, Thimphu, Bhutan	Bhutan	2–0	2–0	2019 AFC Asian Cup qualification
