= Ahmed Niyaz =

Maldivian footballer

Personal information
- Date of birth: 17 March 1980 (age 46)
- Place of birth: Maldives
- Height: 1.78 m (5 ft 10 in)
- Position: Midfielder

Youth career
- Majeediya School

Senior career*
Years	Team	Apps	(Gls)
1999	New Lagoons		
2003–2006	Club Valencia		
2007–2010	VB Sports Club		
2011–2016	New Radiant SC		
2017	Victory		
2017	→ G. Dh. Thinadhoo (loan)		
2018	Green Streets		

International career^{‡}
- Maldives U16
- Maldives U19
- Maldives U23
2003–	Maldives	32	(1)

Managerial career
- 2017: G.Dh. Thinadhoo U21
- 2025–: Maldives (futsal)
- * Club domestic league appearances and goals as of March 31, 2014 ‡ National team caps and goals as of March 31, 2014

Ahmed Niyaz (born 17 March 1980) is a former Maldivian footballer, who is currently playing for New Radiant SC.
