= Akram Abdul Ghanee =

Maldivian footballer (born 1987)

Personal information
- Date of birth: 19 March 1987 (age 39)
- Place of birth: Maafaru, Maldives
- Height: 1.70 m (5 ft 7 in)
- Positions: Defender; midfielder

Team information
- Current team: Victory
- Number: 13

Senior career*
Years	Team	Apps	(Gls)
–2006	Club Valencia	34	(1)
2007–2009	New Radiant SC	22	(2)
2010	VB Sports Club	22	(4)
2011	Maziya	16	(2)
2012	Victory	17	(4)
2013	Club Valencia	17	(3)
2013–2014	New Radiant SC	13	(0)
2015–2016	Club Valencia	?	(?)
2017–2019	New Radiant SC	?	(?)
2019–2021	TC Sports	1	(0)
2021	Club Valencia	?	(?)
2021	→ Club Eagles (loan)	1	(0)
2021–2022	Maziya	1	(0)
2023	Victory	1	(0)
2023–	Maziya S&RC	1	(0)

International career^{‡}
- Maldives U19
2010	Maldives U23		
2007–2022	Maldives	85	(2)
- * Club domestic league appearances and goals ‡ National team caps and goals as of 23:43, 23 September 2022

Akram Abdul Ghanee (born 19 March 1987) is a Maldivian professional footballer who plays for Victory Sports Club as a defender and formerly captained the Maldives national team.

== Honours ==
Maldives

- SAFF Championship: 2018
