= Mohamed Faisal (footballer) =

Maldivian footballer

Personal information
- Date of birth: 4 August 1988 (age 38)
- Place of birth: Fenfushi, Maldives
- Height: 1.83 m (6 ft 0 in)
- Position: Goalkeeper

Team information
- Current team: New Radiant
- Number: 22

Senior career*
Years	Team	Apps	(Gls)
2006–2009	Club AYL	40	(0)
2007	→ Victory (loan)		(0)
2010–2012	Victory	43	(0)
2013	Club Valencia	17	(0)
2014–2015	Club Eagles	17	(0)
2016–2017	Club Valencia	35	(0)
2017–2018	New Radiant	39	(0)
2019–2020	Da Grande	20	(0)
2020–2023	Club Valencia		
2021	→ Club Eagles (loan)	0	(0)
2023–2024	Maziya		(0)
2025	Buru Sports	9	(0)
2025–	New Radiant	0	(0)

International career^{‡}
2010	Maldives U23	1	(0)
2009–	Maldives	39	(0)
Medal record
Men's football
Maldives under-23
Bronze medal – third place	South Asian Games	2010
Maldives
Winner	SAFF Championship	2018
- * Club domestic league appearances and goals as of 22 April 2021 ‡ National team caps and goals as of 18 November 2025

Mohamed Faisal (Dhivehi: މުޙައްމަދު ފައިސަލް; born 4 August 1988) is a Maldivian professional footballer who plays as a goalkeeper for Dhivehi Premier League club New Radiant and the Maldives national team.

Faisal began his career with Club All Youth Linkage, made his debut as a teenager in 2006 Third Division. He started every match of the season in goal and secured promotion to Second Division football as league runner ups. In his second year, Faisal won both Second Division and Dhivehi League (first division) in 2007 with Club AYL and Victory Sports Club while on loan. He also helped Club AYL promote to Dhivehi League for the first time in club's history. He later played for Victory, Valencia, Club Eagles, New Radiant and Da Grande Sports Club. He joined Valencia on a swap deal on deadline day 2020 from Da Grande Sports Club.

Since his national team debut in 2009, he was mostly used as a back-up goalkeeper and earned number one spot following Imran Mohamed's retirement from international football. He led Maldives to win the 2018 SAFF Championship as the tournament's Most Valuable Player.

== Club career ==
Born in Fenfushi, Maldives, Faisal started his playing career with Club All Youth Linkage in 2006, where he helped the team gain promotion to top division from Third Division, during his four year at the club. During his first season, they gained promotion to Second Division as 2006 Third Division runner-ups, also winning the best goalkeeper award.

Faisal won Second Division and Dhivehi League both in 2007. He first claimed 2007 Second Division with Club AYL but failed to get promoted to first division in the play-off. He was then loaned to Victory Sports Club for the rest of the season as their first choice Imran Mohamed got injured, and won first division with them.

In 2008, Faisal earned another best goalkeeper award despite Club AYL were runner-ups of the 2008 Second Division. They also gained promotion to first division football, winning the play-offs.

Faisal left Club AYL to play for Victory SC in 2010, making his debut in the AFC Cup against Indonesian club Sriwijaya. He won the FA Cup and President's Cup in his first two seasons. In 2012, Faisal fractured a bone in his left ankle in the AFC Cup qualifying round against Al-Tilal which sidelined him for five months.

On 2 November 2012, Faisal signed for Club Valencia on a one-year deal for the 2013 season.

Faisal became a Club Eagles player on 25 February 2014. Faisal helped Club Eagles, qualify to the President's Cup for the first time in the club's history, after securing third in the league. They reached the final where they lost to the only goal which came in the extra time.

On 9 April 2015, Faisal suffered an ACL injury during the pre season trainings with Club Eagles. After a gap of one season without a game, Faisal returned for Club Valencia on 7 January 2016. They became the ultimate champions of the 2016 FA Cup, defeating the league runner ups TC Sports Club in the final, ending a trophy drought of 8 years for the club.

On 25 July 2017, Faisal joined New Radiant as Club Valencia failed to secure a top 4 spot in 2017 Malé League. He won a domestic treble in 2017, winning the Premier League, FA Cup and the President's Cup. He also won the Malé League with New Radiant in 2018.

Faisal signed for Da Grande Sports Club on 28 May 2019. He spent one season with the club until returning to Club Valencia for the third time, on a deadline day; 5 December 2020, swap with Mohamed Jazlaan.

On 21 January 2021, Faisal made his third Valencia debut against the newly promoted Super United Sports in the last gameweek of Dhivehi Premier League first round, keeping a clean sheet in the goalless draw. During a Premier League match against United Victory on 22 April 2021, Faisal suffered a hamstring injury, forcing him to make way for Mohamed Shafeeu in the 40th minute of the game.

== International career ==
Faisal made his international debut on 18 April 2009, against Bhutan in the 2010 AFC Challenge Cup qualification. He kept a clean sheet to his name in the game as Maldives won by 5–0.

In 2010, he was called up for the 2010 South Asian Games, where he won bronze with the national under-23 team. He only played the third-place play-off match against India, in which he saved two penalties to win the penalty shoot-out.

Following the retirement of then goalkeeper Imran Mohamed, Faisal was the number one goalkeeper for the national team since 2017. His first major tournament was the 2018 SAFF Championship in which they won the tournament for the second time in their history, also winning the best player award.

== Career statistics ==
=== Club ===
As of match played 15 August 2021

Appearances and goals by club, season and competition
Club	Season	Division	League		FA Cup		President's Cup		Continental (Note: All appearances in AFC Cup)		Other		Total	
Club	Season	Division	Apps	Goals	Apps	Goals	Apps	Goals	Apps	Goals	Apps	Goals	Apps	Goals
Club AYL	2006	Third Division	8	0	0	0	—		—		—		8	0
Club AYL	2007	Second Division	8	0	0	0	—		—		6 (Note: Appearances in 2008 Dhivehi League qualifiers)	0	14	0
Club AYL	2008	Second Division	6	0	2	0	—		—		3 (Note: Appearances in 2009 Dhivehi League qualifiers)	0	11	0
Club AYL	2009	Dhivehi League	18	0	1	0	—		—		0	0	19	0
Club AYL	Total		40	0	3	0	0	0	0	0	9	0	52	0
Victory (loan)	2007	Dhivehi League	0	0	0	0	—		—		—		0	0
Victory	2010	Dhivehi League	21	0	3	0	2	0	6	0	1 (Note: Appearance in 2010 Maldivian FA Charity Shield)	0	33	0
Victory	2011	Dhivehi League	19	0	2	0	2	0	6	0	1 (Note: Appearance in 2011 Maldivian FA Charity Shield)	0	30	0
Victory	2012	Dhivehi League	3	0	2	0	3	0	—		1 (Note: Appearance in 2012 AFC Cup qualifying play-off)	0	9	0
Victory	Total		43	0	7	0	7	0	12	0	3	0	72	0
Valencia	2013	Dhivehi League	17	0	1	0	—		—		—		18	0
Eagles	2014	Dhivehi League	17	0	3	0	3	0	—		—		23	0
Eagles	2015	Premier League	0	0	0	0	—		—		—		0	0
Eagles	Total		17	0	3	0	3	0	0	0	0	0	23	0
Valencia	2016	Premier League	21	0	1	0	—		—		—		22	0
Valencia	2017	Malé League	14	0	—		—		—		5 (Note: 4 Appearances in 2017 AFC Cup qualifying play-off, and 1 Appearance in 2017 Maldivian FA Charity Shield)	0	19	0
Valencia	Total		35	0	1	0	0	0	0	0	5	0	41	0
New Radiant	2017	Premier League	14	0	0	0	1	0	0	0	—		15	0
New Radiant	2018	Malé League	13	0	0	0	0	0	0	0	0	0	25	0
New Radiant	2018	Premier League	12	0	0	0	0	0	0	0	0	0	25	0
New Radiant	Total		39	0	0	0	1	0	0	0	0	0	40	0
Da Grande	2019–20	Premier League	20	0	1	0	—		—		—		21	0
Valencia	2020–21	Premier League	7	0	0	0	0	0	—		—		7	0
Eagles (loan)	2020–21	Premier League	—		—		—		—		1 (Note: Appearance in 2021 AFC Cup qualifying play-off)	0	1	0
Career totals			218	0	15	0	11	0	12	0	18	0	274	0

=== International ===
As of match played 18 November 2025

Appearances and goals by national team and year
National team	Year	Apps	Goals
Maldives U23
Maldives U23	2010	1	0
Total		1	0
Maldives
Maldives	2009	1	0
Maldives	2011	3	0
Maldives	2016	2	0
Maldives	2017	6	0
Maldives	2018	6	0
Maldives	2019	5	0
Maldives	2021	7	0
Maldives	2022	4	0
Maldives	2025	5	0
Total		39	0

== Honours ==
Club AYL

- Third Division runner-up: 2006
- Second Division: 2007; runner-up: 2008

Victory

- Dhivehi League: 2007
- FA Charity Shield runner-up: 2010, 2011, 2012
- Maldives FA Cup: 2010; third place: 2007, 2011
- President's Cup: 2011; runner-up: 2007, 2010, 2012

Eagles

- President's Cup runner-up: 2014

Valencia

- Maldives FA Cup: 2016
- President's Cup: 2021–22
- FA Charity Shield runner-up: 2017

New Radiant

- Dhivehi Premier League: 2017
- Maldives FA Cup: 2017
- President's Cup: 2017
- Malé League: 2018

Maldives

- SAFF Championship: 2018

Maldives U23

- South Asian Games bronze medal: 2010

Individual

- 2006 Third Division best goalkeeper
- 2008 Second Division best goalkeeper
- 2018 SAFF Championship Most Valuable Player
- 2018 SAFF Championship best goalkepper
