= 2010 New Radiant S.C. season =

New Radiant
- Chairman: Mohamed Hanim
- Head Coach: Mohamed Siyaz
- Stadium: Rasmee Dhandu Stadium
- Dhivehi League: 4th
- FA Cup: Runners-up
- President's Cup: Third
Home colours

The 2010 season is New Radiant Sports Club's 31st year in existence as a football club.

== Background ==
New Radiant finished at the 4th position of last year's Dhivehi League, FA Cup and President's Cup.

== Kit ==
Supplier: / Sponsor: Nescafé

New Radiant started the new season without a shirt sponsor but signed a deal worth MVR 300,000 with Nescafé on 7 April 2010.

Home	Goalkeeper

== Competitions ==
=== Overall ===
Competition	Started round	Final position / round	First match	Last match
Dhivehi League	—	Fourth	36 March 2010	24 September 2010
FA Cup	Quarter-finals	Runner-up	29 September 2010	18 October 2010
President's Cup	Semi-final Qualifier	Third	22 October 2010	25 October 2010

=== Competition record ===
Competition	Record							
Competition	G	W	D	L	GF	GA	GD	Win %
Dhivehi League	21	11	3	7	44	31	+13	52.38
FA Cup	3	2	0	1	10	3	+7	66.67
President's Cup	2	1	0	1	4	7	−3	50.00
Total	26	14	3	9	58	41	+17	53.85

=== Dhivehi League ===
Pos	Team	Pld	W	D	L	GF	GA	GD	Pts	Qualification
1	VB Sports Club	21	16	5	0	66	17	+49	53	2011 AFC Cup; President's Cup (Note: Victory SC qualified for the 2011 AFC Cup as 2010 Maldives FA Cup winners.)
2	Victory Sports Club	21	12	6	3	35	16	+19	42	2011 AFC Cup; President's Cup
3	Maziya S&RC	21	10	8	3	35	17	+18	38	President's Cup
4	New Radiant	21	11	3	7	44	31	+13	36	President's Cup
5	Club Valencia	21	8	6	7	34	32	+2	30	
6	Vyansa	21	4	5	12	19	37	−18	17	
7	Thoddoo FC	21	4	0	17	16	60	−44	12	Promotion/relegation playoff
8	Club All Youth Linkage	21	1	3	17	16	55	−39	6	Promotion/relegation playoff

Source: RSSSF.com

==== Matches ====
Date	Round	Opponents	Result F–A	Scorers
26 March 2010	1	Valencia	4–1	Izzath Abdul Baree (3) 9', 17' (pen.), 56', Ibrahim Sabig 58'
9 April 2010	1	Vyansa	2–4	
16 April 2010	1	Club AYL	6–1	
1 May 2010	1	Thoddoo	1–0	
7 May 2010	1	Victory	1–2	
14 May 2010	1	VB Sports	2–1	
21 May 2010	1	Maziya	0–0	
28 May 2010	2	Victory	2–1	Shinaz 7', Charles Wright Gaye 64'
5 June 2010	2	VB Sports	2–3	
9 June 2010	2	Maziya	0–1	
18 July 2010	2	Club AYL	4–1	
25 July 2010	2	Valencia	4–4	Mohamed Nasir 14', Faruhad 16', Plamen Miroslav Petkov 46', Charles Wright Gaye 69'
1 August 2010	2	Vyansa	2–1	
5 August 2010	2	Thoddoo FC	2–0	
20 August 2010	3	Thoddoo FC	3–1	Ahmed Shimhan 45', Thariq (2) 48', 90+?'
25 August 2010	3	Vyansa	1–0	Plamen Miroslav Petkov 21'
1 September 2010	3	Valencia	3–1	Mohamed Amir 21' (o.g.), Thariq 43', Fauzan Habeeb 90+?'
7 September 2010	3	Club AYL	5–3	Charles Wright Gaye (2) 13', 38', Plamen Miroslav Petkov (3) 24', 45', 83'
16 September 2010	3	Victory	1–2	
20 September 2010	3	VB Sports	0–3	
24 September 2010	3	Maziya	0–0	

=== FA Cup ===
Date	Round	Opponents	Result F–A	Scorers
29 September 2010	Quarter-finals	Club AYL	7–1	Thariq (3) 25', 52', 70', Ali Navaau 37', Fauzan Habeeb (2) 49', 84', A. Abdulla 72'
4 October 2010	Semi-finals	VB Sports	2–0 (abd. 78')	Charles Wright Gaye 10', Shiyam 27'
18 October 2010	Final	Victory	1–2	Thoriq 36'

=== President's Cup ===
Date	Round	Opponents	Result F–A	Scorers
22 October 2010	Semi-final Qualifier	Maziya	4–2 (aet)	Adam Shareef 12', Plamen Miroslav Petkov 21', Charles Wright Gaye (2) 107', 116'
25 October 2010	Semi-final	VB Sports	0–5	
