= 2011 New Radiant S.C. season =

New Radiant
- Head Coach: Mohamed Shiyaz
- Stadium: Rasmee Dhandu Stadium
- Dhivehi League: 4th
- FA Cup: Fourth
- President's Cup: Runners-up
- Top goalscorer: League: Ali Fasir (16 goals); All: Ali Fasir (18 goals)
Home colours	Away colours

The 2011 season is New Radiant Sports Club's 32nd year in existence as a football club.

== Background ==
New Radiant finished at the 4th position of last year's Dhivehi League, as runners-up in FA Cup and 3rd in President's Cup as they were beaten by VB Sports Club in the semi-final.

Ali Fasir, Mohamed Jameel and Ahmed Niyaz were some of the biggest signings by the club for the 2011 season.

== Kit ==
Supplier: MediaNet / Sponsor: Milo

Home	Away	Goalkeeper

== Competitions ==
=== Overall ===
Competition	Started round	Final position / round	First match	Last match
Dhivehi League	—	Winner	30 March 2011	23 September 2011
FA Cup	Quarter-finals	Fourth	29 September 2011	30 October 2011
President's Cup	Semi-final Qualifier	Runners-up	16 October 2011	22 October 2011

=== Competition record ===
Competition	Record							
Competition	G	W	D*	L	GF	GA	GD	Win %
Dhivehi League	19	9	4	6	41	24	+17	47.37
FA Cup	3	1	0	2	4	6	−2	33.33
President's Cup	3	2	0	1	6	5	+1	66.67
Total	25	12	4	9	51	35	+16	48.00

*Draws include knockout matches decided on penalty kicks.

=== Dhivehi League ===
==== League table ====
Pos	Team	Pld	W	D	L	GF	GA	GD	Pts	Note
1	VB Sports Club	19	15	2	2	61	12	+49	47	2012 AFC Cup group stage 2011 President's Cup
2	Victory	19	10	5	4	43	28	+15	35	2012 AFC Cup qualifying play-off ^{1} 2011 President's Cup
3	Maziya	19	10	5	4	31	21	+10	35	2011 President's Cup
4	New Radiant	19	9	4	6	41	24	+17	31	2011 President's Cup
5	Club Eagles	19	5	3	11	16	49	−33	18	
6	Club Valencia	19	4	5	10	25	37	−12	17	

Rules for classification: 1) points; 2) goal difference; 3) number of goals scored.
Updated to games played on 24 September 2011.
Source: RSSSF.com

^{1} Victory SC qualified for the 2012 AFC Cup as VB Sports Club also won the 2011 Maldives FA Cup.

==== Matches ====
Date	Round	Opponents	Result F–A	Scorers
30 March 2011	1	VB Addu	2–3	Shiyam 36', Fasir 43'
9 April 2011	1	Club AYL	3–1	Thoriq 44', Fasir 48', Haisham 85'
16 April 2011	1	Vyansa	1–0	Fasir 90+3' (pen.)
23 April 2011	1	Valencia	4–2	Thoriq (2) 15', 68', Shiyam 59', Fasir 78'
6 May 2011	1	Eagles	0–2	
20 May 2011	1	Victory	2–3	Shiyam 11', Fasir 87'
24 May 2011	1	Maziya	0–1	
30 May 2011	2	Club AYL	5–0	Charles 1', Fasir (3) 9', 52' (pen.), 59', Jameel 14'
12 June 2011	2	Vyansa	3–1	Niyaz 2', Shiyam 24', Fasir 59'
15 June 2011	2	Eagles	7–0	Fasir (3) 2' (pen.), 32', 76', Charles 20', Jameel 25', Thoriq 50', Shiyam 70'
18 June 2011	2	VB Sports	2–1	Thoriq (2) 65', 90+3'
24 June 2011	2	Maziya	1–1	Fasir 76' (pen.)
28 June 2011	2	Valencia	0–0	
2 July 2011	2	Victory	1–1	Shiyam 41'
6 September 2011	3	Eagles	2–1	Thoriq 64', Fareed 75'
11 September 2011	3	Valencia	2–2	Fasir 50', Charles 77'
16 September 2011	3	VB Sports	0–1	
20 September 2011	3	Victory	6–1	Fasir (2) 7', 57', Thoriq (2) 61', 81', Shaheem 80', Niyaz 85'
23 September 2011	3	Maziya	0–3	

=== FA Cup ===
Date	Round	Opponents	Result F–A	Scorers
29 September 2011	Quarter-finals	Eagles	2–1	Fasir 48', Abdulla 61'
26 October 2011	Semi-finals	VB Sports	1–2	Thoriq 76'
30 October 2011	Third place	Victory	1–3	Fasir 73'

=== President's Cup ===
Date	Round	Opponents	Result F–A	Scorers
16 October 2011	Semi-final Qualifier	Maziya	2–1	Charles 49', Shaheem 62'
19 October 2011	Semi-final	VB Sports	3–2	Thoriq (2) 42', 86', Niyaz 66'
22 October 2011	Final	Victory	1–2 (aet)	Thoriq 44'
