= Riham Abdul Ghanee =

Maldivian footballer

Personal information
- Date of birth: 2 March 1997 (age 29)
- Place of birth: Malé, Maldives
- Position: Midfielder

Team information
- Current team: Club Eagles
- Number: 12

Youth career
- Club Eagles

Senior career*
| Years | Team | Apps | (Gls) |
| 2015–2016 | Da Grande | | |
| 2017 | Club Eagles | | |
| 2018 | New Radiant | | |
| 2019–2020 | Club Green Streets | | |
| 2020 | → Club Eagles (loan) | | |
| 2021– | Club Eagles | | |

International career
| 2015 | Maldives U19 | | |
| 2019 | Maldives U23 | | |
| 2018– | Maldives | 3 | (0) |
- * Club domestic league appearances and goals

Riham Abdul Ghanee (born 2 March 1997), known simply as Boby, is a Maldivian professional footballer who plays as a midfielder for Club Green Streets and Maldives national team.

== Club career ==
Riham started his career with Maldivian third division side Da Grande Sports Club in 2015, helping his side to win the championship and gain promotion to Second Division. In 2016 Second Division, Da Grande lost to the eventual runner-ups Club Zefrol 1–0 in the semi-finals.

Riham started first division football under coach Ihusan Abdul Ghani at Club Eagles in 2017. He debuted for Eagles in the 2017 Malé League opening match against Maziya in which they lost by a goal to nil. On 22 June 2017, Eagles coach Ihusan suspended Riham from the senior squad for the rest of the season along with two other players – Ibrahim Mubeen and Hassan Raif Ahmed for involving in futsal tournaments.

He won the 2017 FAM Youth Championship with Club Eagles U21s on 29 December 2017.

On 18 January 2018, Riham joined New Radiant. With New Radiant, Riham played in the AFC Cup for the first time, making six appearances in the group stage. On 14 March 2018, he made his first start at the AFC Cup against Aizawl at home, where they won 3–1. He also won the 2018 Malé League in that season.

Riham signed a three-year deal with Club Green Streets in February 2019. He later joined to his former club Club Eagles on loan until end of the season, in January 2020.

== International career ==
Riham has represented Maldives at both under-19 and under-23 level. He played in the 2015 SAFF U-19 Championship, 2016 AFC U-19 Championship qualification and also in 2020 AFC U-23 Championship qualification.

On 23 March 2018, Riham made his debut for the senior Maldives national team, at the National Stadium, Singapore, playing in the starting eleven in the friendly game where they lost 3–2 to Singapore. Three days later, on 27 March 2018, Riham made his competitive debut for the Maldives in a 7–0 win over Bhutan in the 2019 AFC Asian Cup qualifiers, coming in as a 69th-minute substitute for Hamza Mohamed.

On 2 September 2020, Petar Segrt included Riham for the 2018 SAFF Championship, the youngster's first senior tournament. He made his only appearance of the tournament in the goalless draw against Sri Lanka in their opening match, replacing Hamza in the second half.

== Honours ==
Da Grande

- Third Division: 2015

Club Eagles U21s

- FAM Youth Championship: 2017

New Radiant

- Malé League: 2018

Maldives

- SAFF Championship: 2018
