= Hüseyin Cengiz =

Turkish-Dutch footballer

Personal information
- Date of birth: 25 July 1984 (age 42)
- Place of birth: Lochem, Netherlands
- Position: Winger

Senior career*
Years	Team	Apps	(Gls)
2003–2004	De Graafschap	0	(0)
2005–2006	Yozgatspor		
2006	AGOVV	17	(2)
2007	Gençlerbirliği OFTAŞ	1	(0)
2007–2008	→ Kırşehirspor (loan)	14	(2)
2008	Hacettepe	0	(0)
2010–2013	VB Sports Club	47	(8)
2013–2015	Racing Club Lebanon		
- * Club domestic league appearances and goals

Hüseyin Cengiz (born 25 July 1984) is a Turkish-Dutch former footballer.

== Club career ==
Cengiz played for De Graafschap and Turkish side Yozgatspor, before joining Eerste Divisie club AGOVV in 2006.

He left AGOVV for Turkish second division side Gençlerbirliği Oftaş in the January 2007 transfer window. He then had a loan spell alongside a bunch of other Dutch-Turkish footballers at Yeni Kırşehir.

=== VB Sports Club ===
After leaving Turkish football, Hüseyin trained in Holland with De CJV'ers only to sign a professional contract with Maldivian outfit VB Sports Club in 2010.

Cengiz scored his first goal for the club in his first game in the 83rd minute of the game, where VB Sports Club won 8–0 over Thoddoo FC.

== Awards and honours ==
=== Club ===
VB Sports Club

- Dhivehi League (3): 2009, 2010, 2011
- FA Cup (1): 2011
- President's Cup (1): 2010
- FA Charity Shield (3): 2010, 2011, 2012

== Notes ==
^{‡} - VB Sports Club name was changed to VB Addu FC in 2012.
