= Shinaz Hilmy =

Maldivian footballer

Personal information
- Full name: Shinaz Hilmy
- Date of birth: 11 January 1984 (age 42)
- Place of birth: Madifushi, Thaa Atoll, Maldives
- Height: 1.72 m (5 ft 8 in)
- Position: Striker

Senior career*
Years	Team	Apps	(Gls)
2004	New Radiant		
2005–2007	Hurriyya		
2007–2008	Club Valencia	10	(2)
2009	VB Sports Club	6	(2)
2010	New Radiant	17	(4)
2011	Maziya	7	(1)
2012–2013	Club Eagles	19	(3)
2014	Victory	3	(0)
2015	Club Zefrol		
2016	Green Streets		
2017	Da Grande		
2018	Buru		

International career
2006	Maldives U23	6	(0)
2005–2008	Maldives	7	(0)
- * Club domestic league appearances and goals

Shinaz Hilmy (Dhivehi: ޝިނާޒް ޙިލްމީ; born 11 January 1984) is a Maldivian former professional footballer who played as a striker. He represented the Maldives national football team at both youth and senior international levels.

== Club career ==
Hilmy began his professional career with New Radiant in 2004 before moving to Hurriyya SC the following year, where he played from 2005 to 2007. Following the conclusion of the 2007 Maldives Cup Winners' Cup, he transferred to Club Valencia. During the 2008 season, Hilmy won the Dhivehi League title with Valencia.

He then joined VB Sports Club in 2009, before returning to New Radiant for the 2010 season. He then had short stints with Maziya in 2011 and Club Eagles from 2012 to 2013. His final season in the Maldivian first division came in 2014, when he suited up for Victory Sports Club.

In 2015, Hilmy transitioned into lower-division football, signing with second division side Club Zefrol. The following year, he moved to Club Green Streets, where he played a vital role in the team's historic 2016 Second Division campaign. On 24 October 2016, Hilmy scored two crucial goals in the final as Green Streets defeated his former team, Club Zefrol, in a 5–2 victory to claim the Second Division championship and secure automatic promotion to the top-tier Dhivehi Premier League.

He spent the 2017 season with second division side Da Grande Sports Club, before concluding his active playing career in 2018 with third division side Buru Sports Club.

== International career ==
Hilmy received his first call-up to the Maldives national football team at the age of 21, when he was selected by Bulgarian head coach Yordan Stoykov for the 2005 SAFF Gold Cup in Karachi. He made his senior international debut on 9 December 2005, coming on in a group stage match against Sri Lanka, which the Maldives won 2–0.

Following his senior debut, Hilmy transitioned back to youth international football to represent the Maldives under-23 national team during the 2006 calendar year, appearing in the 2006 South Asian Games in Colombo and the 2006 Asian Games in Doha.

Hilmy returned to the senior national team setup in late 2007, featuring in the 2010 FIFA World Cup qualification matches against Yemen.

In 2008, Hilmy featured in the 2011 AFC Asian Cup qualification matches against Lebanon. Later that year, he was named as part of the history-making Maldives squad for the 2008 SAFF Championship. He featured in the group stage against India and the semi-final win against Sri Lanka, helping the nation ultimately secure its historic first-ever regional championship title.

== Career statistics ==
=== International ===
Appearances and goals by national team and year

Appearances and goals by national team and year
National team	Year	Apps	Goals
Maldives	2005	1	0
Maldives	2007	2	0
Maldives	2008	4	0
Senior Total		7	0

== Honors ==
New Radiant

- President's Cup: 2004

Hurriyya

- Dhivehi League: 2005

Club Valencia

- Dhivehi League: 2008
- President's Cup: 2008

VB Sports Club

- Dhivehi League: 2009

Club Green Streets

- Second Division: 2016

Maldives

- SAFF Championship: 2008
