= 2010 Maldivian Second Division Football Tournament =

Maldivian association football season

Second Division
- Season: 2010
- Dates: 11 May 2010 – 28 June 2010
- Champions: Dhivehi Sifainge Club
- Promoted: Club Eagles^{1}

This page includes statistics of Second Division Football Tournament in the 2010 season.

== Stadiums ==
The Group stage was played at Maafannu Turd Ground. League round was held at Gaumee Football Dhan'du.

== Teams ==
Nine teams competited in the 2010 Second Division Football Tournament. These teams were divided into two groups (five teams in group A, four in group B).

=== Group A ===
- Club Eagles
- Club Gaamagu
- Police Club
- Sports Club Mecano
- United Victory

=== Group B ===
- Dhivehi Sifainge Club
- Hurriyya Sports Club
- L.T. Sports Club
- Red Line Club

== Group stage ==
From each group, the top three teams advanced to the league round.

Police Club, Club Eagles and United Victory advanced to the league round from Group A. L.T. Sports Club, Dhivehi Sifainge Club and Red Line Club advanced from Group B.

== League round ==
The top three teams from each group qualified to this round. This round was played between the six teams, where they engaged in a round-robin tournament within itself. The highest ranked team would be declared as champions. The second placed team would be qualified to play in the 2011 Dhivehi league play-off with the champion team.

Dhivehi Sifainge Club won topped the league round, while Club Eagles finished at second. Due to the Football Association of Maldives rules, Dhivehi Sifainge Club was not eligible to play in any play-offs for the first division. Therefore, the play-offs were held with only three teams.

== Awards ==
Award	Winner
Best Player	Adam Lareef
Best Goalkeeper	Ahmed Jinah (Dhivehi Sifainge Club)
Top Scorer	Adam Lareef

== Notes ==
1. Club Eagles gained promotion to the 2011 Dhivehi League after winning second in the 2011 Dhivehi league play-off.
