= 2009 Maldivian Second Division Football Tournament =

Maldivian football season

Second Division
- Season: 2009
- Dates: May 2009 – 10 August 2009
- Champions: Vyansa
- Promoted: Vyansa^{1}
- Relegated: KIN; Maabaidhoo I.G.
- Matches: 66
- Top goalscorer: Ibrahim Saqib (Red Line Club) (27 goals)
- Best goalkeeper: Tholaal Abdul Azeez (Club Eagles)

This page includes statistics of Second Division Football Tournament in the 2009 season.

== Stadiums ==
Matches were played at two venues: Henveiru Football Ground and Maafannu Turf Ground.

== Teams ==
Twelve teams competed in the league – the top two teams would qualify to play in the 2010 Dhivehi league play-off, and the bottom two teams would be relegated to Third division.

== League table ==
Pos	Club	Pts	Promotion, qualification or relegation
1	Vyansa (C, P)	29	2010 Dhivehi league play-off
2	Club Eagles	27	2010 Dhivehi league play-off
3 – 10	Red Line Club; Hurriyya SC; Club Gaamagu; S.C. Mecano; F.C. Cicada; F.C. Baaz; L.T. Sports Club; United Victory	NA	
11 – 12	Kinbidhoo Improvement Network (R); Maabaidhoo I.G. (R)	NA	Relegation to 2010 Third Division

Source: Haveeru Sports
(C) Champion; (P) Promoted; (R) Relegated.

== Results ==
Results	EAG	GAM	BAZ	CIC	HUR	KIN	LTS	MIG	RLC	MEC	UVI	VYA
Eagles												
Gaamagu	–											
Baaz	–	–										
Cicada	–	–	–									
Hurriyya	–	0–0	–	–								
Kinbidhoo IN	–	–	–	–	–							
LT Sports	–	1–2	–	–	–	–						
Maabaidhoo IG	–	–	–	–	–	–	–					
Red Line	–	–	–	–	–	6–0	–	8–0				
Mecano	1–1	–	–	–	1–3	–	–	–	–			
United Victory	1–7	–	–	–	–	–	–	–	–	–		
Vyansa	–	–	11–0	14–2	–	2–0	–	–	7–2	–	2–1	

Updated to match(es) played on unknown. Source: Haveeru Sports

== Awards ==
Award	Winner
Best player	Ibrahim Saqib (Red Line Club)
Best goalkeeper	Tholaal Abdul Azeez (Club Eagles)
Top scorer	Ibrahim Saqib (Red Line Club) 27 Goals
Fair play player	Mohamed Ziyad (Club Eagles)
Fair team	Hurriyya SC

== Notes ==
1. Vyansa gained promotion to the 2010 Dhivehi League after winning second in the 2010 Dhivehi league play-off.
