= 2009 Maldives FA Cup =

Maldives FA Cup
Tournament details
- Country: Maldives
- Teams: 18

Final positions
- Champions: Victory Sports Club
- Runners-up: VB Sports Club

The 2009 Maldives FA Cup was the 22nd edition of the Maldives FA Cup, the premier domestic knockout football competition organized by the Football Association of Maldives.

The tournament featured 18 clubs, including all seven clubs from the 2009 Dhivehi League, four from the Second Division, and six from the Third Division.

The competition began on 13 May 2009, with lower-division teams entering in the early rounds. Six Dhivehi League clubs entered the tournament at the quarter-final stage, while Kalhaidhoo ZJ was the only Dhivehi League side to begin the competition from the first round.

The final was played on 26 September 2009, in which defending champions VB Sports Club were defeated 2–0 by Victory Sports Club. The win marked Victory's third FA Cup title, while VB Sports Club lost an FA Cup final for the first time.

== Qualifying rounds ==
=== Round 1 ===
Date	Home team	Score	Away team	Ref.
13 May 2009	Kalhaidhoo ZJ (1)	8–2	TC Sports Club (3)	
20 May 2009	F.C. Cicada (2)	N/A	Club Eagles (2)	
26 May 2009	United Victory (2)	1–2	Galolhu Sports (3)	

=== Round 2 ===
Date	Home team	Score	Away team
7 June 2009	Kalhaidhoo ZJ (1)	N/A	Dream Sports Club (3)
N/A	Club Eagles (2)	N/A	F.C. Baaz (2)
N/A	Galolhu Sports (3)	N/A	Eight Degree Sports (3)
N/A	Thimarafushi YC (3)	N/A	Mulak Ekuveri ZJ (3)

=== Round 3 ===
Date	Home team	Score	Away team
N/A	Kalhaidhoo ZJ (1)	N/A	Club Eagles (2) /F.C. Baaz (2)
N/A	Galolhu Sports (3) /Eight Degree Sports (3)	N/A	Thimarafushi YC (3)

== Quarter-finals ==
16 July 2009
16:00

VB Sports Club (1)	10–1	Kalhaidhoo ZJ (1)

National Football Stadium, Malé

16 July 2009
21:00

Club Valencia (1)	1–9	Maziya S&RC (1)

National Football Stadium, Malé

17 July 2009
16:00

Club All Youth Linkage (1)	1–2	Victory Sports Club (1)

National Football Stadium, Malé

17 July 2009
21:00

New Radiant SC (1)	8–1	Thimarafushi YC (3)

National Football Stadium, Malé

== Semi-finals ==
18 September 2009
21:00

VB Sports Club (1)	3–2	Club Valencia (1)
Niyaz 5'; Ashfaq 71', 78'		45', 85' Thariq

National Football Stadium, Malé

19 September 2009
21:00

Victory Sports Club (1)	1–0	New Radiant SC (1)
Mbock 38'

National Football Stadium, Malé

== Third place match ==
25 September 2009
21:00

Club Valencia (1)	2–1	New Radiant SC (1)
Jameel 26'; Nashid 75'		40' Charles

National Football Stadium, Malé

== Final ==
26 September 2009
21:00

VB Sports Club (1)	0–2	Victory Sports Club (1)
		51' Ashad; 80' Fazeel

National Football Stadium, Malé
