= 2005 Malé League =

Malé League
- Season: 2005
- Champions: Valencia

The 2005 Malé League was the fifth season of the Malé League. Top 6 teams qualify for the 2005 Dhivehi League while bottom 2 teams were relegated to the 2006 Second Division.

== League table ==
Pos	Team	Pld	W	D	L	GF	GA	GD	Pts	Qualification or relegation
1	Club Valencia (C)	7	5	2	0	20	9	+11	17	Qualification for the 2005 Dhivehi League
2	Victory Sports Club	7	5	1	1	24	5	+19	16	Qualification for the 2005 Dhivehi League
3	New Radiant Sports Club	7	5	1	1	20	10	+10	16	Qualification for the 2005 Dhivehi League
4	Hurriyya Sports Club	7	3	1	3	14	11	+3	10	Qualification for the 2005 Dhivehi League
5	Island Football Club	7	3	1	3	11	18	−7	10	Qualification for the 2005 Dhivehi League
6	Club Eagles	7	1	1	5	13	23	−10	4	Qualification for the 2005 Dhivehi League
7	Vyansa (R)	7	1	1	5	10	20	−10	4	Relegation to the 2006 Second Division Football Tournament
8	Guraidhoo Z.J. (R)	7	0	2	5	7	23	−16	2	Relegation to the 2006 Second Division Football Tournament

Source: RSSSF Maldives 2005
Rules for classification: 1) points; 2) goal difference; 3) number of goals scored.
(C) Champions; (R) Relegated
