= 2006 Malé League =

Malé League
- Season: 2006
- Champions: Victory

The 2006 Malé League is the sixth season of the Malé League.

== Final standings ==
Pos	Team	Pld	W	D	L	GF	GA	GD	Pts	Qualification or relegation
1	Victory Sports Club (C)	7	4	3	0	19	4	+15	15	Qualification for the 2006 Dhivehi League
2	Island Football Club	7	4	1	2	12	7	+5	13	Qualification for the 2006 Dhivehi League
3	Club Valencia	7	4	1	2	11	7	+4	13	Qualification for the 2006 Dhivehi League
4	New Radiant Sports Club	7	3	2	2	13	10	+3	11	Qualification for the 2006 Dhivehi League
5	Guraidhoo Z.J.	7	2	2	3	6	12	−6	8	Qualification for the 2006 Dhivehi League
6	Maziya Sports & Recreation Club	7	2	2	3	12	19	−7	8	Qualification for the 2006 Dhivehi League
7	Hurriyya Sports Club (R)	7	1	3	3	8	10	−2	6	Relegation to the 2007 Second Division Football Tournament
8	Club Eagles (R)	7	0	2	5	6	18	−12	2	Relegation to the 2007 Second Division Football Tournament

Source: rsssf.com
Rules for classification: 1) points; 2) goal difference; 3) number of goals scored.
(C) Champions; (R) Relegated
