= 2021–22 President's Cup (Maldives) =

President's Cup
Tournament details
- Country: Maldives
- City: 1
- Venue: 1
- Dates: 19 December 2021 – 23 January 2022
- Teams: 8

Final positions
- Champions: Valencia
- Runners-up: Maziya

Tournament statistics
- Matches played: 29

The 2021–22 President's Cup was the 68th season of the President's Cup.

== Teams ==
All teams playing in the 2022 Dhivehi Premier League.

== Format ==
Eight teams competing engaged in a round-robin tournament, each team played once against the others. Three points are awarded for a win, one for a draw and zero for a loss. The teams are ranked in the league table by points gained, then goal difference, then goals scored and then their head-to-head record. The top 2 teams qualified for the Final.

== League Round ==
A total of 28 matches will be played in this round.

=== Standings ===
Pos	Club	P	W	D	L	GF	GA	GD	Pts	Qualification
1	Valencia	7	6	1	0	18	5	+13	19	Final
2	Maziya	7	5	0	2	16	6	+10	15	Final
3	Green Streets	7	5	0	2	18	9	+9	15	
4	Super United	7	4	0	3	13	10	+3	12	
5	Eagles	7	3	1	3	13	12	+1	10	
6	TC Sports	7	2	0	5	9	17	−8	6	
7	United Victory	7	1	1	5	7	18	−11	4	
8	Da Grande	7	0	1	0	6	23	−17	1	

Updated to match(es) played on 25 December 2021. Source: President's Cup

=== Positions by round ===
The table lists the positions of teams after each week of matches.

Team \ Round	1	2	3	4	5	6	7
Eagles	5	8	8	6	5	5	5
Green Streets	2	3	3	3	3	2	3
Valencia	1	1	1	2	2	1	1
Da Grande	7	6	6	8	7	7	8
Maziya	3	2	2	1	1	3	2
Super United	6	4	4	4	4	4	4
TC Sports	4	5	5	5	6	6	6
United Victory	8	7	7	7	8	8	7

Last updated: 25 December 2021

=== Matches ===
==== Week 1 ====
19 December 2021 1	Green Streets	5–0	Da Grande	National Football Stadium, Malé
16:00		Report

19 December 2021 2	Valencia	5–0	United Victory	National Football Stadium, Malé
21:00		Report

20 December 2021 3	Maziya	2–0	Super United	National Football Stadium, Malé
16:00		Report

20 December 2021 4	Eagles	0–1	TC Sports	National Football Stadium, Malé
21:00		Report

==== Week 2 ====
24 December 2021 5	Super United	3–1	TC Sports	National Football Stadium, Malé
16:00		Report

24 December 2021 6	Maziya	2–1	Eagles	National Football Stadium, Malé
21:00		Report

25 December 2021 7	Da Grande	1–1	United Victory	National Football Stadium, Malé
16:00		Report

25 December 2021 8	Valencia	3–1	Green Streets	National Football Stadium, Malé
21:00		Report

==== Week 3 ====
29 December 2021 9	Valencia	1–0	Da Grande	National Football Stadium, Malé
16:00

29 December 2021 10	Green Streets	2–0	United Victory	National Football Stadium, Malé
21:00

30 December 2021 11	Eagles	0–2	Super United	National Football Stadium, Malé
16:00

30 December 2021 12	Maziya	2–1	TC Sports	National Football Stadium, Malé
21:00

==== Week 4 ====
3 January 2022 13	Eagles	2–3	United Victory	National Football Stadium, Malé
16:00

3 January 2022 14	Maziya	6–1	Da Grande	National Football Stadium, Malé
21:00

4 January 2022 15	Valencia	2–1	TC Sports	National Football Stadium, Malé
16:00

4 January 2022 16	Green Streets	2–1	Super United	National Football Stadium, Malé
21:00

==== Week 5 ====
8 January 2022 17	Valencia	4–1	Super United	National Football Stadium, Malé
16:00

8 January 2022 18	Green Streets	5–1	TC Sports	National Football Stadium, Malé
21:00

9 January 2022 19	Maziya	4–0	United Victory	National Football Stadium, Malé
16:00

9 January 2022 20	Eagles	3–2	Da Grande	National Football Stadium, Malé
21:00

==== Week 6 ====
13 January 2022 21	Maziya	0–2	Green Streets	National Football Stadium, Malé
16:00

13 January 2022 22	Valencia	2–2	Eagles	National Football Stadium, Malé
21:00

14 January 2022 23	Da Grande	1–3	TC Sports	National Football Stadium, Malé
16:00

14 January 2022 24	Super United	2–0	United Victory	National Football Stadium, Malé
21:00

==== Week 7 ====
18 January 2022 25	TC Sports	1–4	United Victory	National Football Stadium, Malé
16:00

18 January 2022 26	Da Grande	1–4	Super United	National Football Stadium, Malé
21:00

19 January 2022 27	Green Streets	1–4	Eagles	National Football Stadium, Malé
16:00

19 January 2022 28	Maziya	0–1	Valencia	National Football Stadium, Malé
21:00

== Final ==
23 January 2022 29	Valencia	2–1 (a.e.t.)	Maziya	National Football Stadium, Malé
21:00
