= 2011 Maldives FA Cup final =

- Event: 2011 Maldives FA Cup
VB Sports Club	Maziya
6	4
- After extra time
- Date: 31 October 2011
- Venue: National Football Stadium, Malé
- Man of the Match: Ali Ashfaq (VB Sports Club)

The 2011 Maldives FA Cup final was the 24th Final of the Maldives FA Cup.

== Route to the final ==
VB Sports Club
QF	VB Sports Club	w/o	Club Vyansa
SF	VB Sports Club	2–1	New Radiant

Maziya
QF	Club Valencia	1–2	Maziya
SF	Maziya	2–1	Victory

== Match ==
=== Details ===
31 October 2011
21:00

VB Sports Club	6 – 4 (a.e.t.)	Maziya
Ashfaq 52' (pen.), 65', 72', 94'; Ashad 57'; Shamweel 109'	Report	12' A. Rasheed; 30', 82' (pen.), 83' Umair

National Football Stadium, Malé

VB Sports Club	Maziya

== See also ==
- 2011 Maldives FA Cup
