= 2002 Malé League =

Malé League
- Season: 2002
- Champions: IFC

The 2002 Malé League was the second season of the Malé League.

== League table ==
Pos	Team	Pld	W	D	L	GF	GA	GD	Pts	Qualification or relegation
1	Island Football Club (C)	7	6	1	0	20	2	+18	19	Qualification for the 2002 Dhivehi League
2	Victory Sports Club	7	5	1	1	15	5	+10	16	Qualification for the 2002 Dhivehi League
3	Club Valencia	7	5	0	2	20	4	+16	15	Qualification for the 2002 Dhivehi League
4	New Radiant Sports Club	7	3	1	3	9	12	−3	10	Qualification for the 2002 Dhivehi League
5	Hurriyya Sports Club	7	2	3	2	11	15	−4	9	Qualification for the 2002 Dhivehi League
6	S.T.E.L.C.O. Malé	7	2	1	4	7	14	−7	7	Qualification for the 2002 Dhivehi League
7	Guraidhoo Z.J. (R)	7	1	1	5	8	18	−10	4	Relegation to the 2003 Second Division Football Tournament
8	Club Eagles (R)	7	0	0	7	7	27	−20	0	Relegation to the 2003 Second Division Football Tournament

Source: RSSSF Maldives 2002
Rules for classification: 1) points; 2) goal difference; 3) number of goals scored.
(C) Champions; (R) Relegated
