= 2007 President's Cup (Maldives) =

President's Cup
Tournament details
- Country: Maldives
- Teams: 4

Final positions
- Champions: New Radiant
- Runners-up: Victory Sports Club

Tournament statistics
- Matches played: 4
- Goals scored: 12 (3 per match)
- Top goal scorer(s): Shamweel Qasim (2 goals)

The 2007 President's Cup was the 57th season of the President's Cup, a knock-out competition for Maldives' top 4 football clubs. Victory Sports Club are the defending champions, having defeated Club Valencia in last season's final on penalties.

== Broadcasting rights ==
The broadcasting rights for all the matches of 2007 Maldives President's Cup were given to the Television Maldives.

== Qualifier ==
Top 4 teams at the end of 2007 Dhivehi League will be qualified for the President's Cup.

Pos	Club	P	W	D	L	GF	GA	Pts	Qualification
1	Victory Sports Club	12	8	3	1	22	7	27	President's Cup
2	New Radiant	12	7	1	4	25	9	22	President's Cup
3	Club Valencia	12	5	5	2	21	11	20	President's Cup
4	VB Sports Club	12	6	1	5	31	19	19	President's Cup
5	Vyansa	12	6	1	5	16	28	19	
6	Maziya	12	3	2	7	12	20	11	
7	FVD	7	1	1	5	4	26	4	
8	Foakaidhoo Z.J.	7	0	0	7	2	23	0	

== Final qualifier ==
15 September 2007
21:00

Victory Sports Club	1–2	New Radiant
Shiyam 77'		50' Shamweel; 87' Ashfaq

Rasmee Dhandu Stadium, Malé

== Semi-final Qualifier ==
16 September 2007
21:00

Club Valencia	2–2 (a.e.t.)	VB Sports Club
Shinaz 24'; Azim Hussain 33'		71' Ismail; 83' Fazeel
Penalties
	6–7

Rasmee Dhandu Stadium, Malé

== Semi-final ==
19 September 2007
21:00

Victory Sports Club	1–0	VB Sports Club
Anthony 21'

Rasmee Dhandu Stadium, Malé

== Final ==
22 September 2007
21:00

New Radiant	3–1	Victory Sports Club
Assad 22'; Hussain Simaz 36'; Shamweel 47'		65' George Amando Rodriguez

Rasmee Dhandu Stadium, Malé
