= 2009 President's Cup (Maldives) =

President's Cup
Tournament details
- Country: Maldives
- Teams: 4

Final positions
- Champions: Victory Sports Club
- Runners-up: VB Sports Club

Tournament statistics
- Matches played: 4
- Goals scored: 16 (4 per match)
- Top goal scorer(s): Ahmed Rasheed; Daniel Mbock (2 goals)

The 2009 President's Cup is the 59th season of the President's Cup, a knock-out competition for Maldives' top 4 football clubs. Club Valencia are the defending champions, having defeated Victory Sports Club in last season's final.

== Broadcasting rights ==
The broadcasting rights for all the matches of 2009 Maldives President's Cup were given to the Television Maldives.

== Qualifier ==
Top 4 teams at the end of 2009 Dhivehi League will be qualified for the President's Cup.

Pos	Club	P	W	D	L	GF	GA	Pts	Qualification
1	VB Sports Club	18	13	4	1	69	15	43	President's Cup
2	Victory Sports Club	18	11	3	4	39	23	36	President's Cup
3	Maziya	18	9	4	5	47	23	31	President's Cup
4	New Radiant	18	6	5	7	31	33	23	President's Cup
5	Club All Youth Linkage	18	4	8	6	33	33	20	
6	Club Valencia	18	4	4	10	30	37	16	
7	Kalhaidhoo ZJ	18	1	2	15	9	94	5	

== Final qualifier ==
3 October 2009
21:00

VB Sports Club	0–2	Victory Sports Club
	Report	21' Mukhthar; 43' (pen.) Fazeel

Rasmee Dhandu Stadium, Malé

== Semi-final Qualifier ==
4 October 2009
21:00

Maziya	2–1	New Radiant
Ahmed 26'; Nimal 44'	Report	63' Samuel

Rasmee Dhandu Stadium, Malé

== Semi-final ==
7 October 2009
21:00

VB Sports Club	5–3	Maziya
Thasneem 12' (o.g.); Abu 20'; Ashfan 64' (pen.); Ashfaq 74' (pen.); Umar 77'	Report	71' A. Niyaz; 86' Nafiu; 90' Ahmed

Rasmee Dhandu Stadium, Malé

== Final ==
10 October 2009
21:00

Victory Sports Club	2–1	VB Sports Club
Daniel 15', 34'	Report	75' (pen.) Niyaz

Rasmee Dhandu Stadium, Malé
