= 2003 Malé League =

Malé League
- Season: 2003
- Champions: Victory

The 2003 Malé League was the third season of the Malé League.

== League table ==
Pos	Team	Pld	W	D	L	GF	GA	GD	Pts	Qualification or relegation
1	Victory Sports Club (C)	7	6	0	1	23	5	+18	18	Qualification for the 2003 Dhivehi League
2	Club Valencia	7	5	2	0	23	9	+14	17	Qualification for the 2003 Dhivehi League
3	Island Football Club	7	5	1	1	31	10	+21	16	Qualification for the 2003 Dhivehi League
4	Hurriyya Sports Club	7	4	0	3	14	13	+1	12	Qualification for the 2003 Dhivehi League
5	New Radiant Sports Club	7	3	1	3	13	10	+3	10	Qualification for the 2003 Dhivehi League
6	Guraidhoo Z.J.	7	2	0	5	7	22	−15	6	Qualification for the 2003 Dhivehi League
7	Sports Club Mecano (R)	7	1	0	6	11	25	−14	3	Relegation to the 2004 Second Division Football Tournament
8	B.G. Sports Club (R)	7	0	0	7	2	30	−28	0	Relegation to the 2004 Second Division Football Tournament

Source: RSSSF Maldives 2003
Rules for classification: 1) points; 2) goal difference; 3) number of goals scored.
(C) Champions; (R) Relegated
