= 2018 Ramazan Veteran's Cup =

Tournament details
- Country: Maldives
- Teams: 7

Statistics of Ramazan Veteran's Cup in the 2018 season.

== Group stage ==
From each group, the top two teams will be advanced for the Semi-finals.

All times listed are Maldives Standard Time.

Key to colors in group tables
Teams that advance to the semi-finals: Group winners; Group runners-up

=== Group A ===
Team	Pld	W	D	L	GF	GA	GD	Pts
Club Valencia	0	0	0	0	0	0	0	0
Club Eagles	0	0	0	0	0	0	0	0
Maziya Sports & Recreation Club	0	0	0	0	0	0	0	0
Police Club	0	0	0	0	0	0	0	0

20 May 2018
16:30

Club Valencia	5 – 0	Club Eagles
	Report

Turf Ground 1, Malé

21 May 2018
16:30

Maziya Sports & Recreation Club	2 – 0	Police Club
	Report; Report (Dhivehi)

Turf Ground 1, Malé

23 May 2018
16:30

Police Club	0 – 5	Club Valencia
	Report; Report (Dhivehi)

Turf Ground 1, Malé

24 May 2018
16:30

Maziya Sports & Recreation Club	5 – 1	Club Eagles
	Report

Turf Ground 1, Malé

–

Turf Ground 1, Malé

–

Turf Ground 1, Malé

=== Group B ===
Team	Pld	W	D	L	GF	GA	GD	Pts
New Radiant Sports Club	0	0	0	0	0	0	0	0
Dhivehi Sifainge Club	0	0	0	0	0	0	0	0
Victory Sports Club	0	0	0	0	0	0	0	0

19 May 2018
16:30

New Radiant Sports Club	1 – 1	Dhivehi Sifainge Club
	Report

Turf Ground 1, Malé

22 May 2018
16:30

Victory Sports Club	5 – 0	New Radiant Sports Club
	Report; Report (Dhivehi)

Turf Ground 1, Malé

25 May 2018
16:30

Dhivehi Sifainge Club	–	Victory Sports Club

Turf Ground 1, Malé

== Semi-finals ==
–

Turf Ground 1, Malé

–

Turf Ground 1, Malé

== Final ==
–

Turf Ground 1, Malé

== Awards ==
Award	Details
Best Player	
Best Goalkeeper	
