= 2011 Maldivian Second Division Football Tournament =

Second Division Football Tournament
Tournament details
- Country: Maldives
- Teams: 9

Final positions
- Champions: Hurriyya Sports Club

This page includes statistics of Second Division Football Tournament in the 2011 season.

== Teams ==
Nine teams competed in the 2011 Second Division Football Tournament, divided into two groups (five teams in group A, four in group B).

=== Group A ===
- Club Gaamagu
- Club Riverside
- Red Line Club
- L.T. Sports Club
- Hurriyya Sports Club

=== Group B ===
- J.J. Sports Club
- Sports Club Mecano
- United Victory
- Thoddoo FC

== Group stage round ==
From each group, the top three teams would advance to the league round.

=== Group A ===
Hurriyya Sports Club, Club Riverside and Red Line Club advanced to the league round as the top three teams of the group.

Pos	Team	Pts
1	Hurriyya Sports Club	9
2	Club Riverside	7
3	Red Line Club	6
4	L.T. Sports Club	5
5	Club Gaamagu	1

=== Group B ===
United Victory, J.J. Sports Club and Sports Club Mecano advanced to the league round as the top three teams of the group.

Pos	Team	Pts
1	United Victory	9
2	J.J. Sports Club	6
3	Sports Club Mecano	3
4	Thoddoo FC	0

=== Relegation ===
The team with the worst record among the knocked-out teams from the group stage would be relegated to the third division. Thoddoo FC was relegated to third division without getting a single point from the group stage.

Pos	Team	Pts
7	L.T. Sports Club	5
8	Club Gaamagu	1
9	Thoddoo FC (R)	0

== League round ==
The top three teams from each group are qualified to this round. As a total of six teams played in this round of the tournament, the team with the highest number of points would be declared as champions. The champion and runner-up team would also play in the playoff for 2012 Dhivehi League.

Pos	Team	Pts	Qualification
1	Hurriyya Sports Club (C)	13	Play-off
2	United Victory	11	Play-off
3	Club Riverside	9	
4	J.J. Sports Club	5	
5	Sports Club Mecano	4	
6	Red Line Club	0	

== Awards ==
Award	Details
Best Player	Mausoom Abdul Gafoor of Hurriyya Sports Club
Best Goalkeeper	Mohamed Ageel of United Victory
Fair Play Team	Hurriyya Sports Club
