= 2010 President's Cup (Maldives) =

President's Cup
Tournament details
- Country: Maldives
- Teams: 4

Final positions
- Champions: VB Sports Club
- Runners-up: Victory Sports Club

Tournament statistics
- Matches played: 4
- Goals scored: 21 (5.25 per match)
- Top goal scorer: Ali Ashfaq (7 goals)

The 2010 President's Cup is the 60th season of the President's Cup, a knock-out competition for Maldives' top 4 football clubs. Victory Sports Club are the defending champions, having defeated VB Sports Club in last season's final.

== Broadcasting rights ==
The broadcasting rights for all the matches of 2010 Maldives President's Cup were given to the Television Maldives.

== Qualifier ==
Top 4 teams after the end of 2010 Dhivehi League will be qualified for the President's Cup.

Pos	Club	P	W	D	L	GF	GA	Pts	Qualification
1	VB Sports Club	21	16	5	0	66	17	53	President's Cup
2	Victory Sports Club	21	12	6	3	35	16	42	President's Cup
3	Maziya	21	10	8	3	35	17	38	President's Cup
4	New Radiant	21	11	3	7	44	31	36	President's Cup
5	Club Valencia	21	8	6	7	34	32	28	
6	Vyansa	21	4	5	12	19	37	17	
7	Thoddoo FC	21	4	0	17	16	60	12	
8	Club All Youth Linkage	21	1	3	17	16	55	6	

== Final qualifier ==
21 October 2010
21:00

VB Sports Club	1–2	Victory Sports Club
Ashfaq 86'	Report	46' H. Niyaz; 60' (pen.) Fazeel

Rasmee Dhandu Stadium, Malé

== Semi-final Qualifier ==
22 October 2010
21:00

Maziya	2–4 (a.e.t.)	New Radiant
Fuhaid 38'; Nafiu 78'	Report	12' Adam; 21' Petkov; 106', 116' Charles

Rasmee Dhandu Stadium, Malé

== Semi-final ==
25 October 2010
21:00

VB Sports Club	5–0	New Radiant
Ashad 4'; Ashfaq 50', 66'; Cengiz 74'; Hussain 86'	Report (Haveeru Archived)

Rasmee Dhandu Stadium, Malé

== Final ==
28 October 2010
21:00

Victory Sports Club	2–5	VB Sports Club
Samuel 51', 68'	Report	32', 43', 63' (pen.), 81' Ashfaq; 38' Ashad

Rasmee Dhandu Stadium, Malé
