= 2004 Malé League =

Malé League
- Season: 2004
- Champions: New Radiant

The 2004 Malé League was the fourth season of the Malé League.

== League table ==
Pos	Team	Pld	W	D	L	GF	GA	GD	Pts	Qualification or relegation
1	New Radiant Sports Club (C)	7	7	0	0	34	7	+27	21	Qualification for the 2004 Dhivehi League
2	Victory Sports Club	7	6	0	1	41	9	+32	18	Qualification for the 2004 Dhivehi League
3	Club Valencia	7	4	1	2	33	11	+22	13	Qualification for the 2004 Dhivehi League
4	Island Football Club	7	4	1	2	22	11	+11	13	Qualification for the 2004 Dhivehi League
5	Hurriyya Sports Club	7	3	0	4	13	12	+1	9	Qualification for the 2004 Dhivehi League
6	Guraidhoo Z.J.	7	2	0	5	12	14	−2	6	Qualification for the 2004 Dhivehi League
7	Sports Club Mecano (R)	7	1	0	6	6	42	−36	3	Relegation to the 2005 Second Division Football Tournament
8	United Victory (R)	7	0	0	7	7	62	−55	0	Relegation to the 2005 Second Division Football Tournament

Source: RSSSF Maldives 2004
Rules for classification: 1) points; 2) goal difference; 3) number of goals scored.
(C) Champions; (R) Relegated
