= 2011 President's Cup =

2011 President's Cup may refer to:

- 2011 President's Cup (Maldives), football
- 2011 President's Cup (tennis)
