= 2001 Malé League =

Malé League
- Season: 2001
- Champions: Victory

The 2001 Malé League is the first season of the Malé League.

== League table ==
Pos	Team	Pld	W	D	L	GF	GA	GD	Pts	Qualification or relegation
1	Victory Sports Club (C)	10	8	0	2	27	10	+17	24	Qualification for the 2001 Dhivehi League
2	Club Valencia	10	6	2	2	24	17	+7	20	Qualification for the 2001 Dhivehi League
3	Island Football Club	10	6	1	3	22	14	+8	19	Qualification for the 2001 Dhivehi League
4	Hurriyya Sports Club	10	3	2	5	16	25	−9	11	Qualification for the 2001 Dhivehi League
5	New Radiant Sports Club	10	2	2	6	19	24	−5	8	Promotion/relegation playoff for 2002 Malé League
6	Club Eagles	10	0	3	7	7	25	−18	3	Promotion/relegation playoff for 2002 Malé League

Source: RSSSF Maldives 2001
Rules for classification: 1) points; 2) goal difference; 3) number of goals scored.
(C) Champions
