= 2016 Maldives FA Cup final =

- Event: 2016 Maldives FA Cup
TC Sports Club	Club Valencia
1	3
- Date: 11 November 2016
- Venue: National Football Stadium, Malé
- Man of the Match: Hassan Adhuham (Club Valencia)
- Referee: Ahmed Shifan Abdul Raheem (Maldives)

The 2016 Maldives FA Cup final was the 28th Final of the Maldives FA Cup.

== Route to the final ==
TC Sports Club
QF	Eagles	0–1	TC Sports Club
SF	New Radiant	0–3	TC Sports Club

Club Valencia
QF	Club Valencia	1–1 (a.e.t.) (3 – 0 p)	Victory Sports Club
SF	United Victory	1–2	Club Valencia

== Match ==
=== Details ===
11 November 2016
21:00

TC Sports Club	1 – 3	Club Valencia
Nafiu 43'	Report	24', 50' Adhuham; 40' Nihan

National Football Stadium, Malé
Referee: Ahmed Shifan Abdul Raheem (Maldives)

TC Sports Club	Club Valencia

== See also ==
- 2016 Maldives FA Cup
