= 2006 President's Cup (Maldives) =

President's Cup
Tournament details
- Country: Maldives
- Teams: 4

Final positions
- Champions: Victory Sports Club
- Runners-up: Club Valencia

The 2006 President's Cup was the 56th season of the President's Cup, a knock-out competition for Maldives' top 4 football clubs. Victory Sports Club were the defending champions, having defeated New Radiant in last season's final.

== Broadcasting rights ==
The broadcasting rights for all the matches of 2006 Maldives President's Cup were given to the Television Maldives.

== Qualifier ==
Top 4 teams at the end of 2006 Dhivehi League will be qualified for the President's Cup.

== Final qualifier ==
5 October 2006
21:00

| New Radiant | 2–2^{1} | Victory Sports Club |

Rasmee Dhandu Stadium, Malé

5 October 2006
21:00
Replay

| New Radiant | 0–2 | Victory Sports Club |

Rasmee Dhandu Stadium, Malé
Attendance: 0^{2}

Notes

- Note 1: Match was abandoned at 2–2 in the 67th minute due to riots.
- Note 2: Replay was held behind closed doors.

== Semi-final Qualifier ==
6 October 2006
21:00

| Club Valencia | 3–2^{3} | Island FC |

Rasmee Dhandu Stadium, Malé

Notes

- Note 3: Match was abandoned in 88th minute with scores at 3–2 when Island FC walked off. Result stood.

== Semi-final ==
14 October 2006
21:00

| New Radian | 1–2 | Club Valencia |

Rasmee Dhandu Stadium, Malé

== Final ==
22 September 2007
21:00

| Victory Sports Club | 0–0 (a.e.t.) | Club Valencia |
Penalties
| | 3–1 |

Rasmee Dhandu Stadium, Malé
