= 2008 Maldivian Third Division Football Tournament =

Third Division
- Season: 2008
- Dates: 12 March 2009 – 22 April 2009
- Champions: LT Sports Club
- Promoted: LT Sports Club; Club Gaamagu

The 2008 Third Division tournament was scheduled to start in November 2008 with 26 clubs, excluding the Male' Football Club; the Football Association of Maldives decided to exclude them from the 2008 Third Division after a complaint was lodged to the Subordinate Court stating that the Football Association of Maldives election, held in July 2008, was unethical. Despite the complaint, the election was confirmed by the court.

The Male' Football Club filed against Maldives FA for their decision to exile them from the 2008 Third Division tournament and won. The decision was appealed to the High Court by the Football Association, resulting in the Male' Football Club's suspension from the tournament until the 2010 FAM Congress. Since Male' Football Club is not a member of the Football Association of Maldives and was not invited to the election congress, they do not have any legal right to make a complaint against the association.

The 2008 Third Division tournament began on 12 March 2009 with 20 teams. The teams were distributed into six groups.

== Final ==
22 April 2009
16:00

Club Gaamagu	1–2	LT Sports Club
	Report (in Dhivehi)

Turf pitch 1, Malé

== Awards ==
Award	Winner
Best player	Ahmed Niyaz (LT Sports Club)
