= 2007 Dhivehi League =

Dhivehi League
- Season: 2007
- Champions: Victory Sports Club; 1st Dhivehi League title
- AFC Cup: Victory Sports Club

Statistics of Dhivehi League in the 2007 season.

== Overview ==
Victory Sports Club won the Dhivehi League. New Radiant SC won the Maldives National Championship.

== Promotion/relegation playoff Zone 9 for 2008 Dhivehi League ==
Pos	Team	Pld	W	D	L	GF	GA	GD	Pts	Promotion or relegation
1	Maziya	6	4	2	0	14	6	+8	14	Promoted
2	Vyansa	6	3	2	1	10	5	+5	11	Promoted
3	AYL	6	1	2	3	7	10	−3	5	Relegated
4	Guraidhoo ZJ	6	0	2	4	3	13	−10	2	Relegated

== Final standings ==
Pos	Team	Pld	W	D	L	GF	GA	GD	Pts	Qualification
1	Victory	12	8	3	1	22	7	+15	27	Qualification to 2008 AFC Cup group stage President's Cup (Maldives); 2008 Dhivehi League
2	New Radiant	12	7	1	4	25	9	+16	22	President's Cup (Maldives); 2008 Dhivehi League
3	Valencia	12	5	5	2	21	11	+10	20	President's Cup (Maldives); 2008 Dhivehi League
4	VB Sports	12	6	1	5	31	9	+22	19	President's Cup (Maldives); 2008 Dhivehi League
5	Vyansa	12	6	1	5	16	28	−12	19	2008 Dhivehi League
6	Maziya	12	3	2	7	12	20	−8	11	2008 Dhivehi League
7	FVD	7	1	1	5	4	26	−22	4	Qualification to Relegation play-offs
8	Foakaidhoo ZJ	7	0	0	7	2	23	−21	0	Qualification to Relegation play-offs

Source: rsssf.com
Rules for classification: 1) points; 2) goal difference; 3) number of goals scored.
