= 2008 Dhivehi League =

Dhivehi League
- Season: 2008
- Champions: Club Valencia; 5th Dhivehi League title
- AFC Cup: Club Valencia

Statistics football matches of Dhivehi League in the 2008 season.

== Overview ==
Club Valencia won both the Dhivehi League and the Maldives National Championship.

== Clubs ==
- Club Valencia
- Kalhaidhoo ZJ
- Maziya S&RC
- New Radiant SC
- Thinadhoo ZC
- VB Sports
- Victory Sports Club
- Vyansa

== Final standings ==
Pos	Team	Pld	W	D	L	GF	GA	GD	Pts	Qualification
1	Valencia	12	8	2	2	26	11	+15	26	Qualification to 2009 AFC Cup group stage President's Cup
2	VB Sports	12	6	4	2	23	11	+12	22	Qualification to President's Cup
3	Victory	12	5	5	2	24	11	+13	20	Qualification to President's Cup
4	New Radiant	12	6	2	4	28	19	+9	20	Qualification to President's Cup
5	Vyansa	12	3	4	5	16	15	+1	13	2009 Dhivehi League
6	Kalhaidhoo ZJ	12	3	2	7	19	38	−19	11	2009 Dhivehi League
7	Maziya	7	2	1	4	9	14	−5	7	Qualification to Relegation play-offs
8	Thinadhoo ZC	7	0	0	7	5	31	−26	0	Qualification to Relegation play-offs

Rules for classification: 1) points; 2) goal difference; 3) number of goals scored.

== Promotion/relegation playoff for 2009 Dhivehi League ==
Pos	Team	Pld	W	D	L	GF	GA	GD	Pts	Promotion or relegation
1	Club AYL	3	2	1	0	5	0	+5	7	Promoted
2	Maziya	3	1	2	0	1	0	+1	5	Promoted
3	Red Line Club	3	0	2	1	2	6	−4	2	Relegated
4	Vyansa	3	0	1	2	2	4	−2	1	Relegated

7 September 2008

Vyansa	0 – 1	Maziya

9 September 2008

Red Line Club	0 – 4	Club AYL

12 September 2008

Maziya	0 – 0	Red Line Club

13 September 2008

Vyansa	0 – 1	Club AYL

16 September 2008

Maziya	0 – 0	Club AYL

17 September 2008

Vyansa	2 – 2	Red Line Club
