= 2008 President's Cup (Maldives) =

President's Cup
Tournament details
- Country: Maldives
- Teams: 4

Final positions
- Champions: Club Valencia
- Runners-up: Victory Sports Club

Tournament statistics
- Matches played: 4
- Goals scored: 11 (2.75 per match)
- Top goal scorer(s): Hassan Adhuham; Ibrahim Fazeel; Mukhthar Naseer (2 goals)

The 2008 President's Cup is the 58th season of the President's Cup, a knock-out competition for Maldives' top 4 football clubs.New Radiant are the defending champions, having defeated Victory Sports Club in last season's final.

== Broadcasting rights ==
The broadcasting rights for all the matches of 2008 Maldives President's Cup were given to the Television Maldives.

== Qualifier ==
Top 4 teams at the end of 2008 Dhivehi League will be qualified for the President's Cup.

Pos	Club	P	W	D	L	GF	GA	Pts	Qualification
1	Club Valencia	12	8	2	2	26	11	26	President's Cup
2	VB Sports Club	12	6	4	2	23	11	22	President's Cup
3	Victory Sports Club	12	5	5	2	24	11	20	President's Cup
4	New Radiant	12	6	2	4	28	19	20	President's Cup
5	Vyansa	12	3	4	5	16	15	13	
6	Kalhaidhoo ZJ	12	3	2	7	19	38	11	
7	Maziya	7	2	1	4	9	14	7	
8	Thinadhoo ZC	7	0	0	7	5	31	0	

== Final qualifier ==
5 September 2008
21:00

Club Valencia	1–1 (a.e.t.)	VB Sports Club
Marcelin 117'	Report	92' Umar
Penalties
Mukhthar (penalty scored); Norbert (penalty scored); Shafiu (penalty scored); Shifau (penalty missed); Fairooz (penalty scored); Jameel (penalty missed); Rameez (penalty scored)	5–4	(penalty scored) Ashfan; (penalty scored) Lareef; (penalty scored) Niyaz; (penalty scored) Nafiu; (penalty missed) Ashfaq; (penalty missed) Sipos; (penalty missed) Eysa

Rasmee Dhandu Stadium, Malé

== Semi-final Qualifier ==
6 September 2008
21:00

Victory Sports Club	3–1	New Radiant
Adhuham 24'; Ashad 63'; Fazeel 90'	Report	64' Wahid

Rasmee Dhandu Stadium, Malé

== Semi-final ==
10 September 2008
21:00

VB Sports Club	0–1	Victory Sports Club
	Report	71' Adhuham

Rasmee Dhandu Stadium, Malé

== Final ==
15 September 2008
21:00

Club Valencia	3–2 (a.e.t.)	Victory Sports Club
Mukhthar 52', 86' (pen.); Rifau 101'	Report	30' Fazeel; 57' Fareed

Rasmee Dhandu Stadium, Malé
Referee: Ahmed Ameez
