= 2007 Third Division Football Tournament =

Third Division Football Tournament
Tournament details
- Country: Maldives
- Teams: 26

Final positions
- Champions: Maabaidhoo SC
- Runner-up: Kinbidhoo I.N.

The Third Division Football Tournament for the 2007 season in the Maldives started on November 12, 2011. Maabaidhoo Sports Club went on to win the tournament without losing a single game.

== Stadiums ==
The Football Association of Maldives decides to play the matches of this year's tournament in two different stadiums; FAM No: 1 Turf ground and Henveiru Stadium.

== Tournament format ==
The 26 teams are divided into 6 groups in the first round. The team which tops the each group will be qualified to the second round. The 6 teams qualified to the second round again will be divided into 2 groups of 3 teams in each group. The winner of each group will play in the final of the tournament.

== Final ==
14 December 2007	Maabaidhoo SC	1–1 (8–7 p)	Kinbidhoo I.N.	Henveiru Stadium, Malé
16:00	Mohamed Asim	Report (in Dhivehi)	Ahmed Naseem
