= 2018 Maldivian Second Division Football Tournament =

Second Division
- Season: 2018
- Champions: Da Grande Sports Club
- Promoted: Da Grande Sports Club
- Matches: 15
- Goals: 52 (3.47 per match)

This page includes statistics of Second Division Football Tournament in the Maldives in the 2018 season.

== Group stage ==
From each group, the top two teams would advance to the semi-finals.

All times listed are Maldives Standard Time.

Key to colors in group tables
| Teams that advance to the semi-finals: Group winners; Group runners-up |

=== Group 1 ===
| Team | Pld | W | D | L | GF | GA | GD | Pts |
|---|---|---|---|---|---|---|---|---|
| Dhivehi Sifainge Club | 3 | 3 | 0 | 0 | 6 | 0 | +6 | 9 |
| Club PK | 3 | 2 | 0 | 1 | 7 | 3 | +4 | 6 |
| Kudahenveiru | 3 | 1 | 0 | 2 | 3 | 3 | 0 | 3 |
| BG Sports | 3 | 0 | 0 | 3 | 1 | 11 | −10 | 0 |

12 April 2018
16:00

| Kudahenveiru | 3 – 0 | BG Sports |
|---|---|---|
| Daniel Philemon; Godfrey West Omodu | Report |

Turf Ground 1, Malé

13 April 2018
16:00

| Club PK | 0 – 2 | Dhivehi Sifainge Club |
|---|---|---|
| | Report | Oleksandr Kablash; Abdulla Shujau |

Turf Ground 1, Malé

18 April 2018
16:00

| BG Sports | 0 – 3 | Dhivehi Sifainge Club |
|---|---|---|
| | Report | pen.' Rinar Valyeyev |

Turf Ground 1, Malé

19 April 2018
16:00

| Kudahenveiru | 0 – 2 | Club PK |
|---|---|---|
| | Report | Prince Boadu; Shifaz Adil |

Turf Ground 1, Malé

24 April 2018
16:00

| Kudahenveiru | 0 – 1 | Dhivehi Sifainge Club |
|---|---|---|
| | Report | Rinar Valyeyev |

Turf Ground 1, Malé

26 April 2018
16:00

| BG Sports | 1 – 5 | Club PK |
|---|---|---|
| Ahmed Waheed | Report | Prince Boadu; Hussain Fayaz; Hussain Afsal; Shifaz Adil; Ibrahim Maisaan |

Turf Ground 1, Malé

=== Group 2 ===
| Team | Pld | W | D | L | GF | GA | GD | Pts |
|---|---|---|---|---|---|---|---|---|
| JJ Sports | 3 | 2 | 1 | 0 | 10 | 2 | +8 | 7 |
| Da GANG | 3 | 2 | 1 | 0 | 7 | 2 | +5 | 7 |
| Mahibadhoo | 3 | 1 | 0 | 2 | 7 | 12 | −5 | 3 |
| Zefrol | 3 | 0 | 0 | 3 | 4 | 12 | −8 | 0 |

14 April 2018
16:00

| Zefrol | 0 – 1 | Da GANG |
|---|---|---|
| | Report | Abdul Muhaimin |

Turf Ground 1, Malé

17 April 2018
16:00

| JJ Sports | 4 – 0 | Mahibadhoo |
|---|---|---|
| Leandro Resida; Ibrahim Shiyam; Mohamed Muslih; Mohamed Liyah | Report |

Turf Ground 1, Malé

22 April 2018
16:00

| Da GANG | 5 – 1 | Mahibadhoo |
|---|---|---|
| Hussain Shareef; Ahmed Haleem; Everton Souza Santos; Abdul Muhaimin | Report | Ismail Nazeer |

Turf Ground 1, Malé

23 April 2018
16:00

| Zefrol | 1 – 5 | JJ Sports |
|---|---|---|
| Mihamed Rifau | Report | Abdulla Midhuhath Fahmy; Ibrahim Shiyam pen.' pen.' Leandro Resida |

Turf Ground 1, Malé

27 April 2018
16:00

| Zefrol | 3 – 6 | Mahibadhoo |
|---|---|---|
| José Alexander Hernández Ávila | Report | Ahmed Shahir; Adam Fahumaan; Mohamed Shahir; Shuaib Saeed; Mohamed Junaid |

Turf Ground 1, Malé

28 April 2018
16:00

| Da GANG | 1 – 1 | JJ Sports |
|---|---|---|
| Moosa Areef | [ Report] | Leandro Resida |

Turf Ground 1, Malé

== Semi-finals ==
3 May 2018
16:00

| Dhivehi Sifainge Club | 0 – 4 | Da GANG |
|---|---|---|
| | Report | 36' Zaahid Ibrahim; 58' Ahmed Ajwad; 66' Ibrahim Abdulla; 82' Hussain Shareef |

National Football Stadium, Malé

4 May 2018
21:00

| JJ Sports | 2 – 1 | Club PK |
|---|---|---|
| Mohamed Magdi El-Mahmoud 55'; Abdulla Midhuhath Fahmy 57' | Report | 72' (pen.) Prince Boadu |

National Football Stadium, Malé

== Final ==
14 May 2017
21:00

| Da GANG | 0 – 0 | JJ Sports |
|---|---|---|
| | Report |
Penalties
| Ibrahim Abdulla (penalty scored); Abdul Muhaimin (penalty scored); Abdulla Fauzan (penalty scored) | 3 – 1 | (penalty scored) Abdulla Midhuhath Fahmy; (penalty missed) Eisuke Mohri; (penalty missed) Leandro Resida; (penalty missed) Abdul Rasheed Mahir |

National Football Stadium, Malé

== Awards ==
| Award | Details |
|---|---|
| Best Player | Zaahid Ibrahim (Da GANG) |
| Best Goalkeeper | Iyaan Abdul Aleem (Da GANG) |

== Final ranking ==
| Pos | Team | Pld | W | D | L | GF | GA | GD | Pts | Final result |
|---|---|---|---|---|---|---|---|---|---|---|
| 1 | Da GANG (C, Q) | 5 | 3 | 2 | 0 | 11 | 2 | +9 | 11 | Champions & promoted to 2019 Malé League |
| 2 | JJ Sports (Q) | 5 | 3 | 2 | 0 | 12 | 3 | +9 | 11 | Runners-up & qualified for 2019 Malé League qualification |
| 3 | Dhivehi Sifainge Club | 4 | 3 | 0 | 1 | 6 | 4 | +2 | 9 | Semi finalists |
| 4 | Club PK | 4 | 2 | 0 | 2 | 8 | 5 | +3 | 6 | Semi finalists |
| 5 | Mahibadhoo | 3 | 1 | 0 | 2 | 7 | 12 | −5 | 3 | Eliminated in Group stage |
| 6 | Kudahenveiru | 3 | 1 | 0 | 2 | 3 | 3 | 0 | 3 | Eliminated in Group stage |
| 7 | Zefrol | 3 | 0 | 0 | 3 | 4 | 12 | −8 | 0 | Eliminated in Group stage |
| 8 | BG Sports | 3 | 0 | 0 | 3 | 1 | 11 | −10 | 0 | Eliminated in Group stage |

(C) Champions; (Q) Qualified for the phase indicated

Per statistical convention in football, matches decided in extra time are counted as wins and losses, while matches decided by penalty shoot-out are counted as draws.
