= 2011 President's Cup (Maldives) final =

2011 President's Cup final
- Event: 2011 President's Cup (Maldives)
Victory	New Radiant
2	1
- After extra time
- Date: 22 October 2011
- Venue: Rasmee Dhandu Stadium, Malé

The 2011 President's Cup (Maldives) final was the 61st Final of the Maldives President's Cup.

== Route to the final ==
Victory
Final qualifier	VB Sports Club	1–2	Victory Sports Club

New Radiant
Semi-final Qualifier	Maziya	1–2	New Radiant
Semi-final	VB Sports Club	2–3	New Radiant

== Match ==
=== Details ===
22 October 2011
21:00 (UTC+5)

Victory Sports Club	2–1 (a.e.t.)	New Radiant
Fazeel 64'; Fauzan 108'	Report; Report (dv) archived	44' Thoriq

Rasmee Dhandu Stadium, Malé

Victory	New Radiant

== See also ==
- 2011 President's Cup (Maldives)
