= 2006 Third Division Football Tournament =

Third Division Football Tournament
Tournament details
- Country: Maldives

Final positions
- Champions: Red Line Club
- Runners-up: Club All Youth Linkage

The Third Division Football Tournament for the 2006 season in the Maldives. Red Line Club went on to win the tournament without losing a single game.

== Group stage ==
Group A

- Winner: Red Line Club
- Runner up: Foundation for Kuda Henveiru

Group B

- Winner: Club All Youth Linkage
- Runner up: Club Campoa

== Semi finals ==
Red Line Club	1–0	Club Campoa	Malé
	Report (in Dhivehi)

Club All Youth Linkage	3–1	Foundation for Kuda Henveiru	Malé
	Report (in Dhivehi)

== Final ==
21 January 2007	Red Line Club	0–0 (3–2 p)	Club All Youth Linkage	Henveiru Stadium, Malé
16:00	Mohamed Asim	Report (in Dhivehi)	Ahmed Naseem
	Penalties
	Hammad Rasheed (penalty scored); Mohamed Fuhaidh (penalty scored); Hassan Idhuham (penalty scored)		(penalty scored) Ali Ziyam; (penalty scored) Ibrahim Latheef

== Awards ==
Award	Details
Best Player	Yaamin Ibrahim of Club Campoa
Top Scorer	Mohamed Waheed of Club All Youth Linkage
Best Goalkeeper	Mohamed Faisal of Club All Youth Linkage
Fair Play Team	Hithaadhoo Youth Wing
Fair Play Player	Nasrulla Saeed of 8 Degree
