= 2008 Maldivian Second Division Football Tournament =

Second Division Football Tournament
Tournament details
- Country: Maldives

Final positions
- Champions: Red Line Club
- Runners-up: Club All Youth Linkage

The Second Division Football Tournament for the 2008 season in the Maldives was won by the Red Line Club by defeating the defending champions Club All Youth Linkage.

== Group stage ==
=== Group A ===
Team	Pld	W	D	L	GF	GA	GD	Pts	Status
Club All Youth Linkage	3	3	0	0	7	0	+7	9	Second round
Maabaidhoo IG	3	2	0	1	10	2	+8	6	Second round
United Victory	3	1	0	2	6	6	0	3	
Club Teenage	3	0	0	3	2	17	−15	0	

27 July 2008

Club All Youth Linkage	4 – 0	Club Teenage
Asadhulla Abdulla (?) n/a (?)

Henveiru Football Ground, Malé

30 July 2008

United Victory	1 – 2	Maabaidhoo IG

Henveiru Football Ground, Malé

3 August 2008

Club All Youth Linkage	2 – 0	United Victory
Adu Vaku (?); Asadhulla Abdulla (?)	Report

Henveiru Football Ground, Malé

7 August 2008

Club Teenage	0 – 8	Maabaidhoo IG

Henveiru Football Ground, Malé

11 August 2008

Club All Youth Linkage	1 – 0	Maabaidhoo IG

Henveiru Football Ground, Malé

14 August 2008

Club Teenage	2 – 5	United Victory

Henveiru Football Ground, Malé

=== Group B ===
Team	Pld	W	D	L	GF	GA	GD	Pts	Status
Red Line Club	3	3	0	0	13	3	+10	9	Second round
SC Mecano	3	2	0	1	8	10	−2	6	Second round
Club Eagles	3	0	1	2	2	7	−5	0	
KIN	3	0	1	2	3	−6	0	1	

28 July 2008

Club Eagles	0 – 0	KIN

Henveiru Football Ground, Malé

1 August 2008

SC Mecano	1 – 7	Red Line Club

Henveiru Football Ground, Malé

4 August 2008

Club Eagles	1 – 3	SC Mecano

Henveiru Football Ground, Malé

8 August 2008

KIN	1 – 2	Red Line Club

Henveiru Football Ground, Malé

12 August 2008

Club Eagles	1 – 4	Red Line Club

Henveiru Football Ground, Malé

16 August 2008

KIN	2 – 4	SC Mecano

Henveiru Football Ground, Malé

=== Group C ===
Team	Pld	W	D	L	GF	GA	GD	Pts	Status
Hurriyya SC	4	3	0	0	9	1	+8	12	Second round
FC Cicada	4	2	0	2	8	7	+1	6	Second round
FC Baaz	3	0	0	4	3	12	−9	0	

29 July 2008

Hurriyya SC	1 – 0	FC Baaz

Henveiru Football Ground, Malé

2 August 2008

Hurriyya SC	3 – 1	FC Cicada

Henveiru Football Ground, Malé

6 August 2008

FC Baaz	1 – 4	FC Cicada

Henveiru Football Ground, Malé

9 August 2008

Hurriyya SC	4 – 0	FC Baaz

Henveiru Football Ground, Malé

13 August 2008

Hurriyya SC	1 – 0	FC Cicada

Henveiru Football Ground, Malé

17 August 2008

FC Baaz	2 – 3	FC Cicada

Henveiru Football Ground, Malé

== Second round ==
=== Group A ===
Team	Pld	W	D	L	GF	GA	GD	Pts	Status
Club All Youth Linkage	2	2	0	0	3	0	+3	6	Final
Hurriyya SC	2	1	0	1	9	2	+7	3	
SC Mecano	2	0	0	2	1	11	−10	0	

19 August 2008

Club All Youth Linkage	1 – 0	Hurriyya SC

Henveiru Football Ground, Malé

22 August 2008

Club All Youth Linkage	2 – 0	SC Mecano

Henveiru Football Ground, Malé

25 August 2008

Hurriyya SC	9 – 1	SC Mecano

Henveiru Football Ground, Malé

=== Group B ===
Team	Pld	W	D	L	GF	GA	GD	Pts	Status
Red Line Club	2	2	0	0	6	3	+3	6	Final
Maabaidhoo IG	2	1	0	1	9	2	+7	3	
FC Cicada	2	0	0	2	1	11	−10	0	

20 August 2008

Red Line Club	2 – 1	Maabaidhoo IG

Henveiru Football Ground, Malé

23 August 2008

Red Line Club	4 – 2	FC Cicada

Henveiru Football Ground, Malé

26 August 2008

Maabaidhoo IG	5 – 3	FC Cicada

Henveiru Football Ground, Malé

== Final ==
29 August 2008
21:00

Club All Youth Linkage	0–1	Red Line Club
	Report (in Dhivehi)	87' (pen.) Hussain Rasheed

Henveiru Football Ground, Malé

== Awards ==
Award	Details
Best Player	Ahmed Afradh of Red Line Club
Top Scorer	Kuna Emanuel of Red Line Club
Best Goalkeeper	Mohamed Faisal of Club All Youth Linkage
Fair Play Team	Hurriyya SC
Fair Play Player	Abdulla Ibrahim of Hurriyya SC
