= 2013 Third Division Football Tournament =

Third Division
- Season: 2013
- Champions: Huravee Initiative for Youth
- Promoted: Huravee Initiative for Youth; TC Sports Club
- Matches: 68

Statistics of Third Division Football Tournament in the 2013 season. Tournament started on August 19.

== Teams ==
51 teams are competition in the 2013 Third Division Football Tournament, and these teams were divided into 17 groups of 3 teams. Winner of each group and the best 1 team among the group runners-up will be advanced into the second round. Between the 18 teams in the second round, a knock out format will be used.

Group 1

- Our Recreation Club
- Kuda Henveyru United
- Club Middle Bros

Group 2

- Tent Sports Club
- Zeal Sports Club
- Teenage Juniors

Group 3

- Maamigili Youth Recreation Club
- LQ Sports
- Club 010

Group 4

- Youth Revolution Club
- Thoddoo Football Club
- Raising Stars for Vilufushi Recreation

Group 5

- Society Alifushi for Youth
- Vidha
- Lagoons Sports Club

Group 6

- Sports Club Veloxia
- Huravee Inivative for Youth
- Falcon Sports Club

Group 7

- Naivadhoo Trainers Sports Club
- Biss Buru Sports
- Decagon Sports Club

Group 8

- Kelaa Nalhi Sports
- Sports Club Rivalsa
- Buru Sports

Group 9

- Ilhaar
- Club Amigos
- Veyru Sports Club

Group 10

- Club PK
- West Sports Club
- The Futsal Town

Group 11

- Muiveyo Friends Club
- Stelco Recreation Club
- MS Helping Hand Sports Academy

Group 12

- Red Line Club
- Nazaki Sports
- Vaikaradhoo Football Club

Group 13

- Sent Sports Club
- The Vakko Sports Club
- UN Friends

Group 14

- Hinnavaru Youth Society
- CBL Sports
- Sealand Sports Club

Group 15

- Club New Oceans
- New Star Sports Club
- Offu Football Club

Group 16

- LT Sports
- Aim
- Valiant Sports Club

Group 17

- Fiyoree Sports Club
- TC Sports
- The Bows Sports Club

== Group stage ==
=== Group 1 ===
Team	Pld	W	D	L	GF	GA	GD	Pts
Kuda Henveyru United	2	2	0	0	6	1	+5	6
Our Recreation Club	2	1	0	1	6	6	0	3
Club Middle Bros	2	0	0	2	5	10	-5	0

19 August 2014	Our Recreation Club	0–5	Kuda Henveyru United	FAM No: 1 Turf ground, Malé
16:00		Report (in Dhivehi)	20' Ahmed Sunain; 33', 57', 81', 84' (pen.) Ismail Shabeen

25 August 2014	Kuda Henveyru United	–	Club Middle Bros	FAM No: 1 Turf ground, Malé
16:00

12 September 2014	Our Recreation Club	2–3	Club Middle Bros	FAM No: 1 Turf ground, Malé
16:00	Ali Naasih 14' (pen.); Ali Muaz 84'		4' Hussain Rimaz; 21' Naseef Hassan Saeed; 90+1' Shafaz Najeeb

=== Group 2 ===
Team	Pld	W	D	L	GF	GA	GD	Pts
Teenage Juniors	2	2	0	0	5	2	+3	6
Tent Sports Club	2	1	0	1	3	3	0	3
Zeal Sports Club	2	0	0	2	2	5	-3	0

20 August 2014	Tent Sports Club	2–1	Zeal Sports Club	FAM No: 1 Turf ground, Malé
16:00

26 August 2014	Zeal Sports Club	1–3	Teenage Juniors	FAM No: 1 Turf ground, Malé
16:00

12 September 2014	Tent Sports Club	1–2	Teenage Juniors	FAM No: 1 Turf ground, Malé
21:00	Mohamed Hassaan Ahmed 85'		58', 61' Abdul Muhusin Hameed

=== Group 3 ===
Team	Pld	W	D	L	GF	GA	GD	Pts
Maamigili Youth Recreation Club	2	2	0	0	7	0	+7	6
LQ Sports	2	1	0	1	4	6	-2	3
Club 010	2	0	0	2	1	6	-5	0

20 August 2014	Maamigili Youth Recreation Club	5–0	LQ Sports	FAM No: 1 Turf ground, Malé
16:00

26 August 2014	LQ Sports	4–1	Club 010	FAM No: 1 Turf ground, Malé
21:00

13 September 2014	Maamigili Youth Recreation Club	2–0	Club 010	FAM No: 1 Turf ground, Malé
16:00	Ahmed Shakeeb 22'; Ibrahim Rizuhaan 45+1'

=== Group 4 ===
Team	Pld	W	D	L	GF	GA	GD	Pts
Youth Revolution Club	2	1	1	0	4	3	+1	4
Raising Stars for Vilufushi Recreation	2	0	2	0	4	4	0	2
Thoddoo Football Club	2	0	1	1	3	4	-1	1

20 August 2014	Youth Revolution Club	2–1	Thoddoo Football Club	FAM No: 1 Turf ground, Malé
21:00

27 August 2014	Raising Stars for Vilufushi Recreation	2–2	Thoddoo Football Club	FAM No: 1 Turf ground, Malé
16:00

13 September 2014	Youth Revolution Club	2–2	Raising Stars for Vilufushi Recreation	FAM No: 1 Turf ground, Malé
21:00	Hassan Rameez 68'; Ahmed Haleem 77'		41' (pen.), 65' Ahmed Rayyan

=== Group 5 ===
Team	Pld	W	D	L	GF	GA	GD	Pts
Society Alifushi for Youth	2	2	0	0	16	1	+15	6
Lagoons Sports Club	2	1	0	1	3	9	-6	3
Vidha	2	0	0	2	1	10	-9	0

21 August 2014	Society Alifushi for Youth	8–0	Vidha	FAM No: 1 Turf ground, Malé
16:00

27 August 2014	Vidha	1–2	Lagoons Sports Club	FAM No: 1 Turf ground, Malé
21:00

14 September 2014	Society Alifushi for Youth	8–1	Lagoons Sports Club	FAM No: 1 Turf ground, Malé
16:00

=== Group 6 ===
Team	Pld	W	D	L	GF	GA	GD	Pts
Huravee Inivative for Youth	2	2	0	0	11	1	+10	6
Sports Club Veloxia	2	1	0	1	8	2	+6	3
Falcon Sports Club	2	0	0	2	1	17	-16	0

21 August 2014	Sports Club Veloxia	0–2	Huravee Inivative for Youth	FAM No: 1 Turf ground, Malé
16:00

28 August 2014	Huravee Inivative for Youth	9–1	Falcon Sports Club	FAM No: 1 Turf ground, Malé
16:00

14 September 2014	Sports Club Veloxia	8–0	Falcon Sports Club	FAM No: 1 Turf ground, Malé
21:00

=== Group 7 ===
Team	Pld	W	D	L	GF	GA	GD	Pts
Naivadhoo Trainers Sports Club	2	2	0	0	15	3	+12	6
Biss Buru Sports	2	1	0	1	7	7	0	3
Decagon Sports Club	2	0	0	2	3	15	-12	0

21 August 2014	Naivadhoo Trainers Sports Club	5–2	Biss Buru Sports	FAM No: 1 Turf ground, Malé
21:00

28 August 2014	Biss Buru Sports	5–2	Decagon Sports Club	FAM No: 1 Turf ground, Malé
21:00

15 September 2014	Naivadhoo Trainers Sports Club	10–1	Decagon Sports Club	FAM No: 1 Turf ground, Malé
16:00	Mohamed Aslam 2', 32', 83'; Akram Abdul Rasheed 8'; Abdulla Shafiu 17' (61); Hamid Hassan 25' (pen.); Ahmed Hameed 63' (81); Ismail Waheed 85'		43' Mohamed Naseer

=== Group 8 ===
Team	Pld	W	D	L	GF	GA	GD	Pts
Buru Sports	2	1	1	0	5	4	+1	4
Sports Club Rivalsa	2	1	0	1	4	3	+1	3
Kelaa Nalhi Sports	2	0	1	1	4	6	-2	1

22 August 2014	Kelaa Nalhi Sports	1–3	Sports Club Rivalsa	FAM No: 1 Turf ground, Malé
16:00

29 August 2014	Sports Club Rivalsa	1–2	Buru Sports	FAM No: 1 Turf ground, Malé
16:00

15 September 2014	Kelaa Nalhi Sports	3–3	Buru Sports	FAM No: 1 Turf ground, Malé
21:00	Ahmed Inaad 11'; Adam Naseem 12'; Mohamed Shaniu 32'		2' Asif Ali; 45' Ismail Hussain; 69' Ali Hamdhaan

=== Group 9 ===
Team	Pld	W	D	L	GF	GA	GD	Pts
Veyru Sports Club	2	2	0	0	14	1	+13	6
Club Amigos	2	1	0	1	2	6	-4	3
Ilhaar	2	0	0	2	2	11	-9	0

22 August 2014	Ilhaar	1–2	Club Amigos	FAM No: 1 Turf ground, Malé
16:00

29 August 2014	Club Amigos	0–5	Veyru Sports Club	FAM No: 1 Turf ground, Malé
21:00

16 September 2014	Ilhaar	1–9	Veyru Sports Club	FAM No: 1 Turf ground, Malé
16:00	Ibrahim Fazeel 2'		3', 12', 23', 45' Ahmed Hamdhan Hussain; 7' Ali Shaam; 16' Ibrahim Jaleel; 29', 50' Adam Faruhan; 37' Ibrahim Ahmed

=== Group 10 ===
Team	Pld	W	D	L	GF	GA	GD	Pts
Club PK	2	2	0	0	14	1	+13	6
West Sports Club	2	1	0	1	2	6	-4	3
The Futsal Town	2	0	0	2	2	11	-9	0

22 August 2014	Club PK	4–0	West Sports Club	FAM No: 1 Turf ground, Malé
21:00

30 August 2014	West Sports Club	1–0	The Futsal Town	FAM No: 1 Turf ground, Malé
16:00

16 September 2014	Club PK	5–1	The Futsal Town	FAM No: 1 Turf ground, Malé
21:00	Maaz Saeed 26'; Ibrahim Atheeg Hassan 47'; Shamin Naseer 62'; Mansuru Farl 72', 90'		33' Ismail Vifaaq

== Final ==
10 October 2013
16:00

Huravee Initiative for Youth	3–0	TC Sports Club
Husnee Abdul Rahman; Hussain Nazeer; Hussain Liushad	Report

Turf pitch 1, Malé

== Awards ==
Award	Winner
Best player	Ahmed Naushad (Huravee Initiative for Youth)
Fair-play team	Huravee Initiative for Youth
