= Ramazan Veteran's Cup =

- Region: Maldives
- Current champions: New Radiant (3rd title)
- Most championships: Valencia (4 titles)
- 2018 Ramazan Veteran's Cup

Ramazan Veteran's Cup is a Maldivian football competition held in the month of Ramadan, formerly run by The Football Association of Maldives, but lately it is organized by the Soccer Veterans Association of Maldives and Maldives Soccer Mates.

According to the rules of the tournament, players aged 40 and above are considered as veterans. Each team is allowed to list 5 players who are aged between 35 and 40 but only three of those players can play on the pitch together as per the regulations.
