= 2014 Third Division Football Tournament =

Third Division
- Season: 2014
- Champions: Dhivehi Sifainge Club
- Promoted: Dhivehi Sifainge Club; Police Club
- Matches played: 71

The Third Division Football Tournament was the tournament for the 2014 season in the Maldives. Dhivehi Sifainge Club went on to win the tournament, beating Police Club 4–2 on penalties as the scores were leveled 1–1 after the final whistle of the final match played on 11 January 2015.

== Final ==
| 11 January 2015 | Police Club | 1–1 (2–4 p) | Dhivehi Sifainge Club | FAM No. 1 Turf, Malé |
| 16:00 | Ali Munaz 70' | Report (in Dhivehi) | 90+2' Ibrahim Ahmed |
