= Ismail Mahfooz =

Maldivian footballer

Personal information
- Place of birth: Maldives

Senior career*
Years	Team	Apps	(Gls)
- Club Valencia

International career
2001–	Maldives		

Managerial career
- 2006–2014: Maziya S&RC
- 2015: Maldives
- 2017–2018: Maziya S&RC
- 2019–: Da Grande
- * Club domestic league appearances and goals

Ismail Mahfooz also known as Imma Mahfooz is a former Maldivian international footballer and is the current head coach of the Maldives national football team under a caretaker capacity.

== International career ==
Mahfooz played for the Maldives national football team. He was part of the squad that participated at the 2002 FIFA World Cup qualifiers.

== Coaching career ==
=== Maziya S&RC ===
Mahfooz served as head coach of the Maziya Sports and Recreation Club from 2006–2014. Maziya under his watch managed to win the Maldives FA Cup in 2012.

=== Maldives national team ===
Mahfooz served as an assistant coach under Bulgarian head coach, Velizar Popov who was appointed early of 2015. He has been assistant coach as early as 2011. When Popov resigned in August 2015, Mahfooz took over as head coach under a caretaker capacity. The first match under Mahfooz's watch was an away friendly against Philippine club Stallion F.C. which ended in a 2–2 draw. His first full international friendly will be against the Philippines on September 3, 2015 at the Rizal Memorial Stadium.

Ricki Herbert took over Mahfooz after the latter led the team in a World Cup qualifier match against China which was played on September 8, 2015.

=== Managerial ===
As of 8 September 2015.

Nat	Team	from	to	Record				
Nat	Team	from	to	Games	Wins	Draws	Losses	Win %
(Maldives)	Maldives	August 2015	September 2015	2	0	0	2	0.00
Total				2	0	0	2	0.00
