= 2015 Third Division Football Tournament =

Third Division Football Tournament
- Season: 2015

The 2015 Third Division Football Tournament is the first season under its current league division format. The season begins in June.

== Structure and rule changes ==
Third division will be played for two stages according to the changes brought to the 2015 season.

Zone stage

- Zone 1—8 includes clubs from all atolls of the Maldives.
- Zone 9 split into two groups.
- Male' clubs compete in Zone 9 group 1.
- Offices and companies' recreation clubs compete in Zone 9 group 2.
- Each zone play separate competitions (Zone 9 groups also play separate competition).
- Champion teams of all zones qualify for final stage (also referred as Male' round).

Final stage

- 10 teams qualified for this stage divided into two even groups.
- Teams play against each other once.
- Top two teams of each group advance into semi-finals.
- Two finalists qualify tor next year's Second Division Football Tournament.

== Teams ==
A total of 10 teams will be entering into the final stage of the competition.

== Final stage ==
=== Group stage ===
==== Group A ====
Team	Pld	W	D	L	GF	GA	GD	Pts
TBA	0	0	0	0	0	0	0	0
TBA	0	0	0	0	0	0	0	0
TBA	0	0	0	0	0	0	0	0
TBA	0	0	0	0	0	0	0	0
TBA	0	0	0	0	0	0	0	0

v

v

v

v

v

v

v

v

v

v

==== Group B ====
Team	Pld	W	D	L	GF	GA	GD	Pts
TBA	0	0	0	0	0	0	0	0
TBA	0	0	0	0	0	0	0	0
TBA	0	0	0	0	0	0	0	0
TBA	0	0	0	0	0	0	0	0
TBA	0	0	0	0	0	0	0	0

v

v

v

v

v

v

v

v

v

v

=== Semi-finals ===
v

v

=== Final ===
v
