= 2017 FAM Youth Championship =

FAM Youth Championship
Tournament details
- Country: Maldives
- Venue: 1
- Dates: 22 – 29 December
- Teams: 4

Final positions
- Champions: Eagles (3rd title)
- Runners-up: Maziya

Tournament statistics
- Matches played: 7
- Goals scored: 15 (2.14 per match)
- Top goal scorer(s): Ibrahim Atheeq Hassan (5 goals)

The 2017 FAM Youth Championship is the 6th season of the FAM Youth Championship.

== Participated Teams ==
4 teams participated in this year's Youth Championship.

- Club Eagles U21s
- Thinadhoo Football Team U21s
- Maziya Sports & Recreation Club U21s
- United Victory U21s

=== Personnel ===
| Team | Coach | Captain |
|---|---|---|
| Eagles U21s | (Maldives) Ahmed Shakir | (Maldives) Hussain Sifaau Yoosuf |
| Thinadhoo U21s | (Maldives) Ahmed Niyaz | (Maldives) |
| Maziya U21s | (Maldives) Ahmed Suzayr | (Maldives) Ali Samooh |
| United Victory U21s | (Maldives) Hussein Solah | (Maldives) |

== Format ==
Since only 5 teams are participating, the championship will be played on round robin basis. Each team will face every other team once respectively and the team with the most points will win the title.

== Standings ==
- All matches are played in Malé, Maldives.
- Times listed are Indian Ocean, Maldives, UTC+05:00.

Key to colours in group tables
| Advance to Final |

| Pos | Team | Pld | W | D | L | GF | GA | GD | Pts | Status |
|---|---|---|---|---|---|---|---|---|---|---|
| 1 | Maziya U21s | 3 | 2 | 1 | 0 | 8 | 1 | +7 | 7 | Final |
| 2 | Eagles U21s | 3 | 2 | 1 | 0 | 4 | 0 | +4 | 7 | Final |
| 3 | Thinadhoo U21s | 3 | 0 | 1 | 2 | 1 | 6 | −5 | 1 | |
| 4 | United Victory U21s | 3 | 0 | 1 | 2 | 0 | 6 | −6 | 1 | |

Updated to match(es) played on 23 December 2017. Source:
Rules for classification: 1) points; 2) head-to-head points; 3) head-to-head goal difference; 4) goal difference; 5) number of goals scored;
22 December 2017
15:50

| Eagles U21s | 1–0 | Thinadhoo U21s |
|---|---|---|
| Mohamed Naim 17' | Report |

National Football Stadium, Malé
Attendance: 250
23 December 2017
15:50

| Maziya U21s | 3–0 | United Victory U21s |
|---|---|---|
| Irufaan Adam Naseer 9'; Hassan Fuwad 24'; Ibrahim Atheeq Hassan 61' | Report |

National Football Stadium, Malé
Attendance: 150

25 December 2017
15:50

| Eagles U21s | 0–0 | Maziya U21s |
|---|---|---|
| | Report |

National Football Stadium, Malé
Attendance: 300
25 December 2017
21:00

| Thinadhoo U21s | 0–0 | United Victory U21s |
|---|---|---|
| | Report |

National Football Stadium, Malé
Attendance: 200

27 December 2017
15:50

| Thinadhoo U21s | 1–5 | Maziya U21s |
|---|---|---|
| Zilal Mohamed ?' | Report | 22', ?', ?' Ibrahim Atheeg ?' Hassan Fuwadh ?' Mohamed Sakhaau |

National Football Stadium, Malé
Attendance: 230
27 December 2017
21:00

| Eagles U21s | 3–0 | United Victory U21s |
|---|---|---|
| Raahul Abdul Samad ?', ?'; Elaf Ahmed ?' | Report |

National Football Stadium, Malé
Attendance: 180

== Final ==
29 December 2017
15:50

| Maziya U21s | 1–1 (a.e.t.) | Eagles U21s |
|---|---|---|
| Ibrahim Atheeq Hassan 43' | Report | 87' Ahmed Tholal |
Penalties
| | 7–8 |

National Football Stadium, Malé
Attendance: 570

== Statistics ==
=== Clean sheets ===
| Rank | Player | Club | Clean sheets |
|---|---|---|---|
| 1 | (Maldives) Mohamed Ashwan | Eagles | 3 |
| 2 | (Maldives) Hussain Shareef | Maziya | 2 |
