= 2022 Dhivehi Premier League =

Dhivehi Premier League
- Season: 2022
- Dates: 16 February – 1 August
- Champions: Maziya
- Relegated: Da Grande
- AFC Cup: Maziya; Eagles (play-offs)
- Top goalscorer: (Spain) Tana (18 goals)

The 2022 Dhivehi Premier League is the seventh season of the Premier League, the top Maldivian professional league for association football clubs since its establishment in 2015.

== Teams and their divisions ==
Note: Table lists clubs in alphabetical order.

Team	Division	Stadium	Capacity
Eagles	Maafannu	National Football Stadium (Maldives)	5,000
Green Streets	Machchangolhi	National Football Stadium (Maldives)	5,000
Valencia	Machchangolhi	National Football Stadium (Maldives)	5,000
Da Grande	Maafannu	National Football Stadium (Maldives)	5,000
Maziya	West Maafannu	National Football Stadium (Maldives)	5,000
Super United	Machchangolhi	National Football Stadium (Maldives)	5,000
TC Sports Club	Henveiru	National Football Stadium (Maldives)	5,000
United Victory	Galolhu	National Football Stadium (Maldives)	5,000

== League table ==
Pos	Team	Pld	W	D	L	GF	GA	GD	Pts	Qualification or relegation
1	Maziya (C)	21	20	0	1	85	5	+80	60	Qualification for 2023–24 AFC Cup group stage
2	Eagles	21	15	1	5	38	28	+10	46	Qualification for 2023–24 AFC Cup preliminary round 2
3	Valencia	21	10	2	9	29	39	−10	32	
4	Green Streets	27	9	9	9	31	35	−4	36	
5	TC Sports	21	8	4	9	27	30	−3	28	
6	United Victory	21	7	5	9	26	39	−13	26	
7	Super United	21	4	3	14	22	48	−26	15	2023 Dhivehi Premier League play-off
8	Da Grande	21	1	2	18	16	50	−34	5	2023 Dhivehi Premier League play-off

Source: Dhivehi Premier League 2022
Rules for classification: 1) Points; 2) Head-to-head points; 3) Head-to-head goal difference; 4) Head-to-head goals scored; 5) Goal difference; 6) Goals scored.
(C) Champions

== 2023 Dhivehi Premier League play-off ==
Pos	Team	Pld	W	D	L	GF	GA	GD	Pts	Qualification or relegation
1	Super United	3	2	1	0	4	0	+4	7	Qualified for 2023 Dhivehi Premier League
2	Buru Sports	3	2	0	1	6	4	+2	6	Qualified for 2023 Dhivehi Premier League
3	Teenage	3	0	2	1	3	5	−2	2	Relegated to 2023 Maldivian Second Division
4	Da Grande	3	0	1	2	3	7	−4	1	Relegated to 2023 Maldivian Second Division

Source: Promotion/Relegation Playoff
Rules for classification: 1) Points; 2) Head-to-head points; 3) Head-to-head goal difference; 4) Head-to-head goals scored; 5) Goal difference; 6) Goals scored.
