= 2011 President's Cup (Maldives) =

President's Cup
Tournament details
- Country: Maldives
- Teams: 4

Final positions
- Champions: Victory Sports Club
- Runners-up: New Radiant Sports Club

Tournament statistics
- Matches played: 4
- Goals scored: 14 (3.5 per match)
- Top goal scorer: Ahmed Thoriq (3 goals)

The 2011 President's Cup was the 61st season of the President's Cup, a knock-out competition for Maldives' top 4 football clubs. VB Sports Club were the defending champions, having defeated Victory Sports Club in last season's final.

== Broadcasting rights ==
The broadcasting rights for all the matches of 2011 Maldives President's Cup were given to the Television Maldives.

== Qualifier ==
Top 4 teams after the end of 2011 Dhivehi League third round were qualified for the President's Cup.

| Pos | Team | Pld | W | D | L | GF | GA | GD | Pts | Qualification |
|---|---|---|---|---|---|---|---|---|---|---|
| 1 | VB Sports Club | 19 | 15 | 2 | 2 | 61 | 12 | +49 | 47 | President's Cup |
| 2 | Victory Sports Club | 19 | 10 | 5 | 4 | 43 | 28 | +15 | 35 | President's Cup |
| 3 | Maziya | 19 | 10 | 5 | 4 | 31 | 21 | +10 | 35 | President's Cup |
| 4 | New Radiant | 19 | 9 | 4 | 6 | 41 | 24 | +17 | 31 | President's Cup |
| 5 | Club Eagles | 19 | 5 | 3 | 11 | 16 | 49 | −33 | 18 | |
| 6 | Club Valencia | 19 | 4 | 5 | 10 | 25 | 37 | −12 | 17 | |

== Final qualifier ==
15 October 2011
21:00

| VB Sports Club | 1–2 | Victory Sports Club |
|---|---|---|
| Fazeeh 5' | Report; Sun Sports | 7' Fazeel; 76' Adhuham |

Rasmee Dhandu Stadium, Malé

== Semi-final Qualifier ==
16 October 2011
21:00

| Maziya | 1–2 | New Radiant |
|---|---|---|
| Fernando 24' | Report; Sun Sports | 49' Charles; 62' Shaheem |

Rasmee Dhandu Stadium, Malé

== Semi-final ==
19 October 2011
21:00

| VB Sports Club | 2–3 | New Radiant |
|---|---|---|
| Abu 60'; Cengiz 64' | Report; Sun Sports | 42', 86' Thoriq; 66' Niyaz |

Rasmee Dhandu Stadium, Malé

== Final ==
22 October 2011
21:00

| Victory Sports Club | 2–1 (a.e.t.) | New Radiant |
|---|---|---|
| Fazeel 64'; Fauzan 108' | Report; Sun Sports | 44' Thoriq |

Rasmee Dhandu Stadium, Malé

== Statistics ==
=== Scorers ===
| Rank | Player | Club | Goals |
|---|---|---|---|
| 1 | (Maldives) Ahmed Thoriq | New Radiant | 3 |
| 2 | (Maldives) Ibrahim Fazeel | Victory | 2 |
| 3 | (Maldives) Adam Fazeeh | VB Sports Club | 1 |
| 3 | (Maldives) Hassan Adhuham | Victory | 1 |
| 3 | (Spain) Fernando Chaparro | Maziya | 1 |
| 3 | (Liberia) Wright Charles Gaye | New Radiant | 1 |
| 3 | (Maldives) Shaheem Abdul Gadir | New Radiant | 1 |
| 3 | (Sierra Leone) Abu Desmond Mansaray | VB Sports Club | 1 |
| 3 | (Turkey) Hüseyin Cengiz | VB Sports Club | 1 |
| 3 | (Maldives) Ahmed Niyaz | New Radiant | 1 |
| 3 | (Maldives) Fauzan Habeeb | Victory | 1 |

=== Assists ===
| Rank | Player | Club | Assists |
|---|---|---|---|
| 1 | (Maldives) Hussain Shimaz | Victory | 1 |
| 1 | (Maldives) Mohamed Umair | Maziya | 1 |
| 1 | (Maldives) Ahmed Niyaz | New Radiant | 1 |
| 1 | (Maldives) Ibrahim Shiyam | New Radiant | 1 |
| 1 | (Maldives) Shamweel Qasim | VB Sports Club | 1 |
| 1 | (Maldives) Ismail Mohamed | VB Sports Club | 1 |
| 1 | (Maldives) Ahmed Thoriq | New Radiant | 1 |
| 1 | (Maldives) Ibrahim Fazeel | Victory | 1 |
