= 2010 Third Division Football Tournament =

Third Division Football Tournament
Tournament details
- Country: Maldives
- Teams: 35

Final positions
- Champions: J.J. Sports
- Runners-up: Club Riverside

The Third Division Football Tournament for the 2010 season in the Maldives played with 35 teams.

== Semi final ==
1 January 2011	Naavaidhoo Trainers SC	0–0 (5–6 p)	Club Riverside	FAM No: 1 Turf ground, Malé
16:00		Report (in Dhivehi)

3 January 2011	J.J. Sports	4–0	K. Maafushi New Star	FAM No: 1 Turf ground, Malé
16:00		Report (in Dhivehi)

== Final ==
6 January 2011	Club Riverside	0–2	J.J. Sports	Henveiru Stadium, Malé
16:00		Report (in Dhivehi)	Mohamed Afradh; Hassan Raushan
