= 2005 President's Cup (Maldives) =

President's Cup
Tournament details
- Country: Maldives
- Teams: 4

Final positions
- Champions: Victory Sports Club
- Runners-up: New Radiant

Tournament statistics
- Matches played: 4
- Goals scored: 17 (4.25 per match)

The 2005 President's Cup was the 55th season of the President's Cup, a knock-out competition for Maldives' top 4 football clubs.

== Broadcasting rights ==
The broadcasting rights for all the matches of 2005 Maldives President's Cup were given to the Television Maldives.

== Qualifier ==
Top 4 teams at the end of 2005 Dhivehi League will be qualified for the President's Cup.

== Final qualifier ==
23 October 2005
21:00

Hurriyya	1–6	New Radiant

Rasmee Dhandu Stadium, Malé

== Semi-final Qualifier ==
24 October 2005
21:00

Club Valencia	1–5	Victory Sports Club

Rasmee Dhandu Stadium, Malé

== Semi-final ==
27 October 2005
21:00

Hurriyya	1–2	Victory Sports Club

Rasmee Dhandu Stadium, Malé

== Final ==
31 September 2005
21:00

New Radian	0–1	Victory Sports Club
		Ismail

Rasmee Dhandu Stadium, Malé
