= Malé League =

Former Maldivian football association league

- Organising body: Football Association of Maldives
- Founded: 2001
- First season: 2001
- Folded: 2018; 8 years ago
- Country: Maldives
- Number of clubs: 8 (2018)
- Promotion to: Dhivehi League
- Relegation to: Second Division
- Last champions: New Radiant (2nd title)
- Most championships: Victory SC (3 titles)

Malé League was a tournament for football clubs of the Maldives based in Malé. The top four teams qualified for the Dhivehi League, and bottom four played qualifying round with top teams from the Second Division.

== Previous winners ==
- 2001: Victory Sports Club
- 2002: Island FC
- 2003: Victory Sports Club
- 2004: New Radiant SC
- 2005: Club Valencia
- 2006: Victory Sports Club
- 2007–2016: not held
- 2017: Maziya
- 2018: New Radiant SC
