= 2007 Maldivian Second Division Football Tournament =

Second Division Football Tournament
Tournament details
- Country: Maldives

Final positions
- Champions: Club All Youth Linkage
- Runner-up: Vyansa

The 2007 Second Division Football Tournament was the 2nd edition of the Second Division Football Tournament in the Maldives. Club All Youth Linkage won the tournament after defeating Vyansa on penalties.

== Group 1 ==
- Hurriyya
- FC Cicada
- C. Teenage
- United Victory
- BG Sports

== Group 2 ==
- Vyansa
- All Youth Linkage
- ADD
- Red Line Club
- New Star

== Group 3 ==
- C.Eagles
- TCMO
- Velozia
- Macano
- FC Baaz

== Final ==
1 May 2007	Club All Youth Linkage	1–1 (5–4 p)	Vyansa	Galolhu National Stadium, Malé
16:00	Hussain Shujau 85'	Report (in Dhivehi)	17' Ibrahim Shiyad
	Penalties
	(penalty missed) (penalty missed); Dukunor Emanuel (penalty scored) (penalty scored) (penalty scored) (penalty scored); Ibrahim Sauhadh (penalty scored)		(penalty scored) Ahmed Rilwan; (penalty scored) Hassan Solah; (penalty missed) Ibrahim Nisham; (penalty missed) Ibrahim Shiyad (penalty scored) (penalty scored); (penalty missed) Ahmed Waheed
