= 2016 Maldives FA Cup =

Maldives FA Cup
Tournament details
- Country: Maldives
- Teams: 16

Final positions
- Champions: Club Valencia
- Runners-up: TC Sports Club

Tournament statistics
- Matches played: 17
- Goals scored: 68 (4 per match)

The 2016 Maldives FA Cup is the 28th edition of the Maldives FA Cup. It is being continued after a one-year break.

== Qualifying rounds ==
=== Round one ===
18 August 2016 1	Confere Sports Club	0 – 0 (3 - 4 p)	Nolhivaranfaru Youth Development	FAM Turf no. 1, Malé
15:50		[ Report]

19 August 2016 2	Youth Revolution Club	11 – 0	Club D.S.	FAM Turf no. 1, Malé
15:50		[ Report]

20 August 2016 3	Muiveyo Friends Club	0 – 0 (4 – 5 p)	Veyru Sports Club	FAM Turf no. 1, Malé
15:50		[ Report]

=== Round two ===
21 August 2016 4	Nolhivaranfaru Youth Development	5 – 1	Valiant Sports Club	FAM Turf no. 1, Malé
15:50		[ Report]

22 August 2016 5	Felcon Sports Club	2 – 3	Villimale United	FAM Turf no. 1, Malé
15:50		[ Report]

=== Round three ===
23 August 2016 6	Youth Revolution Club	3 – 3 (2 – 4 p)	Veyru Sports Club	FAM Turf no. 1, Malé
15:50		[ Report]

27 August 2016 7	Nolhivaranfaru Youth Development	1 – 7	Villimale United	FAM Turf no. 1, Malé
15:50		[ Report]

== Qualifying play-offs ==
25 October 2016 8	BG Sports Club	8 – 0	Veyru Sports Club	National Football Stadium, Malé
15:50	Kingsley x3 Afsal; Usam; Aflaah; Hamdhaan; I. Rasheed	Report

25 October 2016 9	United Victory	6 – 0	Villimale United	National Football Stadium, Malé
21:00	Kerić x2 Haisham; Mahmood; Naavy; Shimaz	Report

== Quarter finals ==
30 October 2016 10	New Radiant	1 – 1 (a.e.t.) (3 – 2 p)	BG Sports Club	National Football Stadium, Malé
21:00	Haneef 56'	Report	2' M. Nizam
	Penalties
	Mohamed (penalty scored); Hamza (penalty missed); Samir (penalty missed); Niyaz (penalty missed); Velichkov (penalty scored); Suhail (penalty scored)		(penalty scored) Philemon; (penalty missed) Saabig; (penalty missed) David Osagie; (penalty missed) Jailam; (penalty scored) Hamdhaan; (penalty missed) I. Rasheed

31 October 2016 11	Club Eagles	0 – 1	TC Sports Club	National Football Stadium, Malé
21:00		Report	3' Fasir

2 November 2016 12	Club Valencia	1 – 1 (a.e.t.) (3 – 0 p)	Victory Sports Club	National Football Stadium, Malé
21:00	Fuhaid 70'	Report	57' West
	Penalties
	Arif (penalty scored); A. Rilwan (penalty scored); Sifan (penalty scored)		(penalty missed) Abdulrahman; (penalty missed) Saleh; (penalty missed) Yasin

3 November 2016 13	Maziya	0 – 0 (a.e.t.) (2 – 3 p)	United Victory	National Football Stadium, Malé
21:00		Report
	Penalties
	Nashid (penalty scored); Yaamin (penalty missed); Irufan (penalty scored); Ashad (penalty missed); Zhivko (penalty missed)		(penalty scored) Đorđe; (penalty missed) Kerić; (penalty scored) Mahmoud; (penalty missed) Moosa; (penalty scored) Shimaz

== Semi finals ==
6 November 2016 14	New Radiant	0 – 3	TC Sports Club	National Football Stadium, Malé
21:00		Report	31' Fasir; 79' Ibrahim W. 89' Naiz

7 November 2016 15	United Victory	1 – 2	Club Valencia	National Football Stadium, Malé
21:00	Shimaz 7'	Report	35' Kaka; 81' Adhuham

== Third place match ==
10 November 2016 16	New Radiant	2 – 1	United Victory	National Football Stadium, Malé
21:00	Hamza 17' (pen.); Adis 36'	Report	14' Shafraz

== Final ==
11 November 2016 17	TC Sports Club	1 – 3	Club Valencia	National Football Stadium, Malé
21:00	Nafiu 43'	Report	24', 50' Adhuham; 40' Nihaan	Referee: Ahmed Shifan Abdul Raheem (Maldives)
