= Da Grande Sports Club =

Da Grande
- Full name: Da Grande Amigos New Generation Sports Club
- Nickname(s): Da G.A.N.G, Da Grande, Amigos
- Founded: 2 March 2015; 10 years ago
- Ground: National Football Stadium
- Capacity: 11,850
- Coordinates: 4°10′26.7″N 73°30′47.1″E
- Chairman: Naseeh Mohamed
- Head coach: Ismail Mahfooz
- League: Dhivehi Premier League

Da Grande Amigos New Generation Sports Club, generally known as Da Grande Sports Club, is a Maldivian professional football club that competes in the Dhivehi Premier League, the highest tier of Maldivian football.

== Club history ==
The club won promotion to the First Division in 2018, after becoming the champions of 2018 Second Division Football Tournament. They also won the Third Division Football Tournament in 2015.

=== Domestic history ===
Season	League								FA Cup	President's Cup	Top goalscorer		Head coach
Season	Div.	Pos.	Pl.	W	D	L	GS	GA	FA Cup	President's Cup	Name	Goals	Head coach
2015	3rd	1st							–	–			
2016	2nd	Semi-finals	6	4	1	1	25	5	–	–			
2017	2nd	Group stage	4	2	0	2	15	6	–	–			
2018	2nd	1st	5	3	2	0	11	2	–	–	(Maldives) Abdul Muhaimin (Maldives) Hussain Shareef (Maldives) Ahmed Haleem	2	(Maldives) Fareed Mohamed
2019–20	1st	5th	21	7	6	8	33	32	Semi-finals (Note: Due to the COVID-19 pandemic in the Maldives, the 2020 Maldives FA Cup was cancelled and declared null and void by the Football Association of Maldives.)	–	(Iraq) Obaida Kadum Ahmed	17	(Maldives) Ismail Mahfooz
2020–21	1st	5th	14	4	4	6	17	25	–	–			(Maldives) Ismail Mahfooz
2022	1st	8th	21	1	2	18	16	50	Quarter-finals	8th			(Maldives)
2023–24	2nd	13th	4	0	0	4	?	?	–	–			(Maldives)

== Players ==
=== Current squad ===
As of 14 June 2019

Note: Flags indicate national team as defined under FIFA eligibility rules; some limited exceptions apply. Players may hold more than one non-FIFA nationality.

No.	Pos.	Nation	Player
1	GK	(Maldives) MDV	Mifdad Ahmed
2	DF	(Maldives) MDV	Mohamed Nizam
3	DF	(Maldives) MDV	Shifan Hassan
4	DF	(Maldives) MDV	Ahmed Vijudhaan (vice-captain)
5	MF	(Maldives) MDV	Ahmed Hassan
6	DF	(Maldives) MDV	Muruthala Adnan
7	MF	(Maldives) MDV	Ahmed Imaaz
8	MF	(Maldives) MDV	Abdulla Fauzan
9	FW	(Maldives) MDV	Tholaal Naseer
10	FW	(Maldives) MDV	Ayaaz Ahmed
11	FW	(Maldives) MDV	Ahmed Nizam
12	MF	(Maldives) MDV	Ahmed Shameem
13	MF	(Maldives) MDV	Mohamed Wilf
14	DF	(Maldives) MDV	Hassan Eenaaz
15	DF	(Maldives) MDV	Ahmed Sizan

No.	Pos.	Nation	Player
16	MF	(Maldives) MDV	Ali Ifaz
17	MF	(Maldives) MDV	Ahmed Husaam
18	GK	(Maldives) MDV	Ahmed Humaam
19	DF	(Maldives) MDV	Mohamed Rasheed (Captain)
20	FW	(Ivory Coast) CIV	Kouassi Kobenan Emmanuel
21	MF	(Maldives) MDV	Yasfaadh Habeeb
22	GK	(Maldives) MDV	Mohamed Faisal
23	FW	(Iraq) IRQ	Obaida Kadhum Ahmed
24	MF	(Maldives) MDV	Ahnaf Rasheed
25	GK	(Maldives) MDV	Iyaan Abdul Aleem
26	DF	(Maldives) MDV	Abdulla Bassam
29	MF	(Ghana) GHA	Torsu Christian Dodzi
30	DF	(Maldives) MDV	Hussain Shuaib (3rd captain)
31	DF	(Maldives) MDV	Mohamed Sahil
33	DF	(Senegal) SEN	Ndiour Babacar

== Management team ==
Position	Staff
Manager	(Maldives) Mohamed Amjad
Assistant manager	(Maldives) Khalid Ali
Head coach	(Maldives) Ismail Mahfooz
Assistant coach	(Maldives) Ibrahim Nabeel
Goalkeeper coach	(Maldives) Hussain Habeeb
Medical Officer	(Maldives) Ali Musharraf
Officials	(Maldives) Luayyu Adam
Officials	(Maldives) Abdulla Raamih

== Honours ==
=== League ===
- Second Division
  - Winners: 2018
- Third Division
  - Winners: 2015
