= 2010 Dhivehi League =

Dhivehi League
- Season: 2010
- Champions: VB Sports Club; 2nd Dhivehi League title
- Relegated: Thoddoo FC
- AFC Cup: VB Sports Club
- Top goalscorer: Ali Ashfaq
- Longest unbeaten run: 21 games VB Sports Club

Statistics of Dhivehi League in the 2010 season.

== Clubs ==
- All Youth Linkage FC
- Club Valencia
- Maaziya SRC
- New Radiant SC
- Thoddoo FC (name changed from Kalhaidhoo ZJ)
- VB Sports
- Victory Sports Club
- Vyansa

== League table ==
Pos	Team	Pld	W	D	L	GF	GA	GD	Pts	Qualification
1	VB Sports Club	21	16	5	0	66	17	+49	53	2011 AFC Cup; President's Cup (Note: Victory SC qualified for the 2011 AFC Cup as 2010 Maldives FA Cup winners.)
2	Victory Sports Club	21	12	6	3	35	16	+19	42	2011 AFC Cup; President's Cup
3	Maziya S&RC	21	10	8	3	35	17	+18	38	President's Cup
4	New Radiant	21	11	3	7	44	31	+13	36	President's Cup
5	Club Valencia	21	8	6	7	34	32	+2	30	
6	Vyansa	21	4	5	12	19	37	−18	17	
7	Thoddoo FC	21	4	0	17	16	60	−44	12	Promotion/relegation playoff
8	Club All Youth Linkage	21	1	3	17	16	55	−39	6	Promotion/relegation playoff

Source: RSSSF.com

== 2011 Dhivehi League promotion/relegation play-off ==
Pos	Team	Pld	W	D	L	GF	GA	GD	Pts	Qualification
1	Club All Youth Linkage	2	1	1	0	2	0	+2	4	2011 Dhivehi League
2	Club Eagles	2	1	1	0	1	0	+1	4	2011 Dhivehi League
3	Thoddoo FC	2	0	0	2	0	3	−3	0	

Source: rsssf.com
