= 2010 Maldives FA Cup =

Football cup tournament

Maldives FA Cup
Tournament details
- Country: Maldives

Final positions
- Champions: Victory SC
- Runner-up: New Radiant SC

The 2010 Maldives FA Cup, also referred to as the Coca-Cola FA Cup due to sponsorship, was the 23rd edition of the Maldives FA Cup.

A total of 25 teams competed in this edition of the FA Cup.

The cup winners were guaranteed a place in the 2011 AFC Cup.

== Quarter-finals ==
Team 1	Score	Team 2
28 September 2010
VB Sports Club	1–0	Thoddoo FC
29 September 2010
All Youth Linkage FC	1–7	New Radiant SC
30 September 2010
Club Valencia	1–1 (aet) (3–1 p)	Maaziya SRC
1 October 2010
Vyansa	1–3	Victory SC

== Semi-finals ==
Team 1	Score	Team 2
4 October 2010
VB Sports Club	0–2 (abd. 78')	New Radiant SC
5 October 2010
Club Valencia	2–2 (aet) (1–4 p)	Victory SC

== Third place match ==
Team 1	Score	Team 2
17 October 2010
VB Sports Club	3–1	Club Valencia

== Final ==
18 October 2010

New Radiant SC	1–2	Victory SC
Ahmed Thoriq 36'	Report	Hussain Niyaz 27'; Mohamed Jameel 81'
