= Club All Youth Linkage =

Maldivian football club

- Full name: Club All Youth Linkage
- Nickname: AYL
- Founded: c. 2006
- Ground: Various in Malé, Maldives
- League: Third Division
Home colours	Away colours

Club All Youth Linkage, commonly known as Club AYL or simply AYL, is a Maldivian football club based in Malé. The club competed in the top tier of Maldivian football until 2014, during the era of the Dhivehi League, and has since participated in the lower divisions of the Maldivian football league system.

The club is noted for its role in youth development and for providing a pathway for emerging players into senior football.

== History ==
Following its establishment in 2006, AYL entered the Third Division in the same year. The club reached the final of the tournament, where they were defeated by Red Line Club on penalties. Despite the loss, AYL were promoted to the Second Division as runners-up.

In the 2007 Second Division, AYL won the championship, defeating Vyansa on penalties in the final. As there was no direct promotion to the top tier at the time, both finalists qualified for the promotion play-offs for the 2008 Dhivehi League. However, AYL were unsuccessful in securing promotion.

The following season, AYL again reached the Second Division final in 2008, but were defeated 1–0 by Red Line Club. The club subsequently competed in the promotion/relegation play-offs for the 2009 Dhivehi League, where they successfully secured promotion to the top division.

AYL competed in the Dhivehi League from 2009 until 2014. In its debut season, the club achieved a mid-table finish, establishing itself as a competitive side despite limited financial resources.

AYL maintained a consistent presence in the league during this period. The club achieved notable cup performances, reaching the semi-finals of the Maldives FA Cup in consecutive seasons.

In 2012, AYL reached the semi-finals, where they were defeated 2–1 by Club Eagles. They subsequently won the third-place play-off with a 4–3 victory over Victory Sports Club. The following season, AYL again reached the semi-finals of the FA Cup, losing to Maziya S&RC. In the third-place match, they were defeated 2–1 by Club Eagles.

In the 2013 Dhivehi League, AYL finished fourth, qualifying for the President's Cup, the oldest football tournament in the Maldives. In the competition, which was played in a play-off format, AYL competed in the semi-final qualifier, where they were defeated 3–2 by BG Sports Club.

In 2015, Maldivian top-flight football was restructured with the introduction of the Dhivehi Premier League. By this time, AYL had dropped out of the top tier and competed in the Second Division. During the 2016 season, the club was relegated. Since 2017, Club AYL has competed in the Third Division of Maldivian football.

== Identity ==
=== Youth development ===
AYL has been recognized for its development-oriented philosophy, providing opportunities for young players to gain first-team experience before moving to larger clubs.

== Stadium ==
The club has played its matches at National Football Stadium in Malé, during their top-flight days. They use FAM Turf Grounds during lower division.

== Honours ==
League

- Second Division (level 2)
  - Champions: 2007
  - Runners-up: 2008
- Third Division (level 3)
  - Runners-up: 2006

Cup

- Maldives FA Cup
  - Bronze: 2012

== Notable players ==
- (Maldives) Ali Fasir
- (Maldives) Mohamed Fasir
- (Maldives) Asadhulla Abdulla
- (Maldives) Mohamed Faisal
- (Maldives) Ali Samdhooh Mohamed
- (Sri Lanka) Channa Ediri Bandanage
- (Nepal) Ju Manu Rai
- (Maldives) Moosa Yaamin
- (Brazil) Everton Pedalada
- (Sierra Leone) Abu Desmond Mansaray
- (Maldives) Naiz Hassan
- (Maldives) Ali Haafiz

== See also ==
- Dhivehi League
- Football Association of Maldives
