= Maldivian Third Division Football Tournament =

- Country: Maldives
- Number of clubs: 40 (10 in final round)
- Level on pyramid: 3
- Promotion to: Second Division
- Domestic cup: FA Cup

Third Division Football Tournament is the third division of the Maldivian football league system, organized by the Football Association of Maldives.

A new structure for the Third Division Football Tournament was introduced for the 2015 season.

== Structure ==
Changes were brought to the third division league structure 23 December 2014, by the FAM's FIFA normalizing committee.

According to the new structure, the third division consists of 9 zones under 2 groups. Joint zone 1—8 includes clubs from all atolls of the Maldives, and zone 9 is played between clubs from Male'.

Both zones plays own qualification tournament and the champion clubs will be qualified for the final round, which is also referred as Male' round. The final round consists of 10 clubs divided into two groups of five. Each club plays against the other in the group once and the top two clubs advance into the semi-finals. Winners of the semi-finals will be promoted to the next season's Second Division Football Tournament.

== List of winners ==
- 2006: Red Line Club
- 2007: Mahibadhoo SC
- 2008: LT Sports Club
- 2009: Dhivehi Sifainge Club
- 2010: JJ Sports Club
- 2011: Club Zefrol
- 2012: Mahibadhoo SC
- 2013: Huravee Initiative for Youth
- 2014: Dhivehi Sifainge Club
- 2015: Da Grande Sports Club
- 2016: VK Sports Club
- 2017: Dhivehi Sifainge Club
- 2018: Rock Street Sports Club
- 2021: Buru Sports Club
- 2022: Lagoons Sports Club
- 2026: T.F.T Sports

== See also ==
- List of football clubs in Maldives
