= 2011 Dhivehi League =

Dhivehi League
- Season: 2011
- Champions: VB Sports Club
- AFC Cup: VB Sports Club

Statistics of Dhivehi League in the 2011 season.

== Clubs ==
- All Youth Linkage FC
- Club Eagles
- Club Valencia
- Club Vyansa
- Maziya S&RC
- New Radiant SC
- VB Sports Club
- Victory Sports Club

== Standings ==
Format: In Round 1 and Round 2, all eight teams played against each other. Top six teams after Round 2 play against each other in Round 3. Teams with most total points after Round 3 are crowned the Dhivehi League champions and qualify for the AFC Cup. The top four teams qualify for the President's Cup. Bottom two teams after Round 2 play against top two teams of Second Division in Dhivehi League Qualification for places in next year's Dhivehi League.

Pos	Team	Pld	W	D	L	GF	GA	GD	Pts	Qualification
1	VB Sports Club	19	15	2	2	61	12	+49	47	2012 AFC Cup group stage President's Cup
2	Victory Sports Club	19	10	5	4	43	28	+15	35	2012 AFC Cup qualifying play-off President's Cup (Note: Victory SC qualified for the 2012 AFC Cup as VB Sports Club also won the 2011 Maldives FA Cup.)
3	Maaziya SRC	19	10	5	4	31	21	+10	35	President's Cup
4	New Radiant SC	19	9	4	6	41	24	+17	31	President's Cup
5	Club Eagles	19	5	3	11	16	49	−33	18	
6	Club Valencia	19	4	5	10	25	37	−12	17	
7	All Youth Linkage FC	14	3	2	9	13	36	−23	11	Promotion/relegation playoff
8	Club Vyansa	14	2	0	12	9	32	−23	6	Promotion/relegation playoff

== Season Statistics ==
=== Scorers ===
Rank	Player	Club	Goals
1	Ibrahim Fazeel	Victory Sports Club	17
2	Ali Fasir	New Radiant	16
3	Ali Ashfaq	VB Sports Club	14
4	Ibrahim Hamdhaan	Club Valencia	10

=== Assists ===
Rank	Player	Club	Assists
1	Ibrahim Hamdhaan	Valencia	6
1	Rilwaan Waheed	Valencia	6

== Promotion/relegation playoff ==
Pos	Team	Pld	W	D	L	GF	GA	GD	Pts	Qualification
1	All Youth Linkage FC	3	3	0	0	12	3	+9	9	2012 Dhivehi League
2	Club Vyansa	3	2	0	1	3	6	−3	6	2012 Dhivehi League
3	United Victory	3	1	0	2	3	5	−2	3	
4	Hurriyya SC	3	0	0	3	3	7	−4	0	
