= Guraidhoo (Kaafu Atoll) =

Island in Kaafu Atoll, Maldives

Guraidhoo ގުރައިދޫ
- Inhabited island
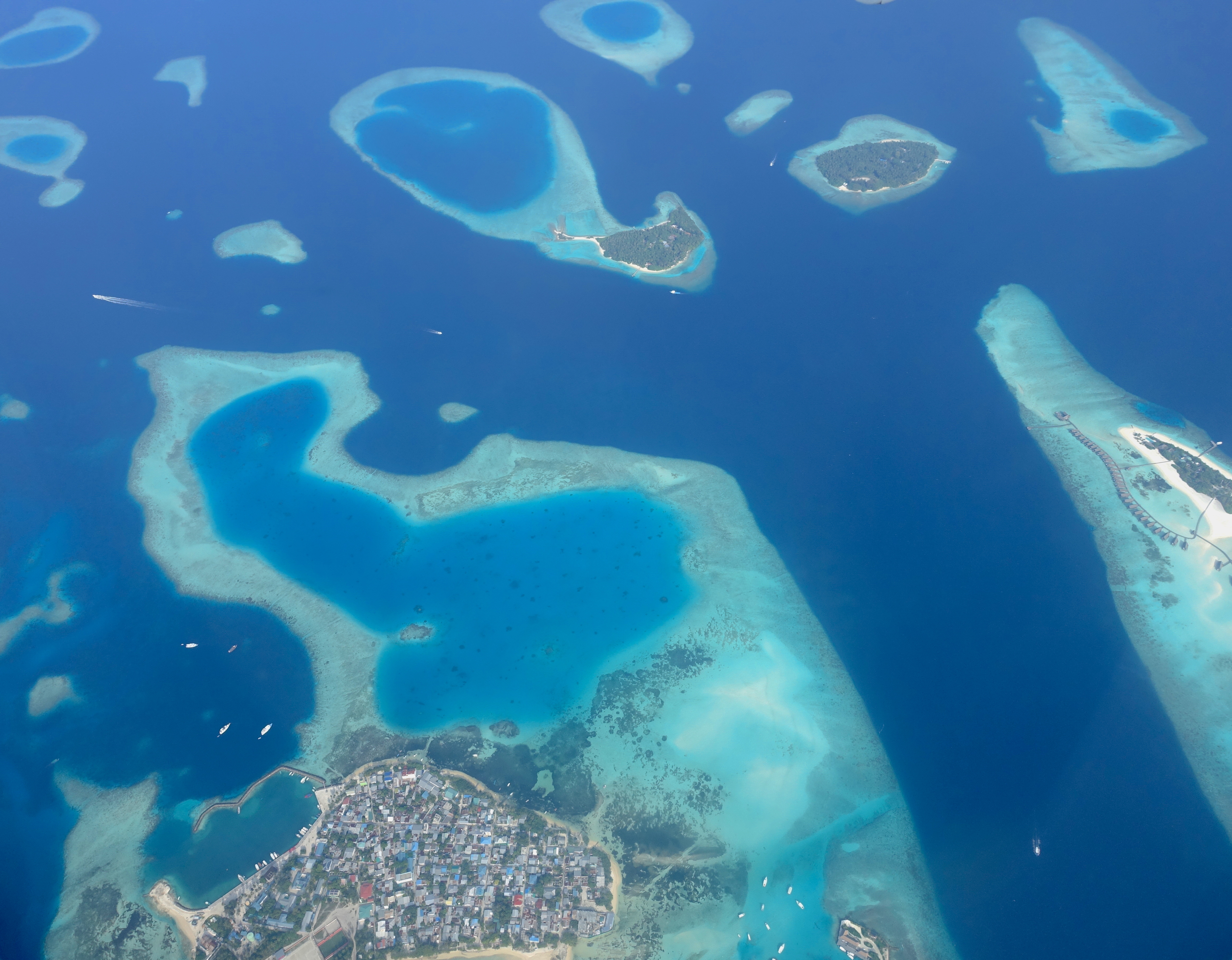
- Aerial view of Guriadhoo and surrounding atolls

- Location in Maldives
- Coordinates: 03°54′00″N 73°28′06″E
- Country: Maldives
- Administrative atoll: Kaafu Atoll
- Distance to Malé: 30.77 km (19.12 mi)

Dimensions
  - Length: 0.675 km (0.419 mi)
  - Width: 0.500 km (0.311 mi)

Population (2022)
  - Total: 1,743 (including foreigners)
- Time zone: UTC+05:00 (MST)

Guraidhoo (Dhivehi: ގުރައިދޫ) is one of the inhabited islands of Kaafu Atoll in the Maldives.

== Geography ==
Guraidhoo Kandu, a protected marine area in South Male Atoll, boasts multiple dive sites, with two primary channels – Lhosfushi Kandu and Guraidhoo Kandu

The island is 30.77 km (19 mi; 17 nmi) south of the country's capital, Malé. Guraidhoo is less than 1 km (0.62 mi) long and wide. It is located in South Malé Atoll. Guraidhoo is about 31 km (19 mi) from Male Airport – the only way you can reach it is by boat.

== Demography ==
Historical population
Year	Pop.	±%
2006	1,220	—
2014	1,580	+29.5%
2022	1,743	+10.3%
2006-2022: Census populations Source:

== Economy ==
=== Infrastructure ===
Guraidhoo has about 3000 locals (2023) Guraidhoo has the only psychiatric facility in the Maldives.

== Sport ==
Guraidhoo is recognized for its surfing and turtle snorkeling, dolphins, sand banks, and diving spots plus wind surfing water sports and dolphin back riding.

== Transport ==
The public MTCC ferry takes 2 hours and 15 min to reach Guraidhoo. The Escape speedboat ferry takes 45 min.

Speedboat ferry:

- Guaraidhoo to Male
- Male to Guaraidhoo

Price 2023 25 USD per person. There are 3 departures every day from both Malé and Guraidhoo

Public MTCC ferry (no. 309)

- Guraidhoo to Male
- Male to Guraidhoo

Price 2023 22 MVR per person The ferry departs from Guraidoo Saturday to Thursday at 7 am From Malé it departs Saturday to Thursday at 2.30-3 pm
