= 2011 Maldives FA Cup =

Maldives FA Cup
Tournament details
- Country: Maldives

Final positions
- Champions: VB Sports Club
- Runners-up: Maziya S&RC

The 2011 Maldives FA Cup was the 24th edition of the Maldives FA Cup.

The cup winner were guaranteed a place in the 2012 AFC Cup.

== First round ==
Team 1	Score	Team 2
19 July 2011
Hurriyya SC	9–1	BG Sports Club
20 July 2011
Zefrol	2–2 (2–4 p)	Club PK
21 July 2011
TC Sports Club	6–0	Club O1O
22 July 2011
Nazaki Sports	1–8	Club Riverside
23 July 2011
Club Valiant	1–4	Club PK
27 July 2011
Hurriyya SC	–	Club PK

== Second round ==
Team 1	Score	Team 2
28 July 2011
TC Sports Club	–	Club Riverside
30 July 2011
Club Eagles	2–2 (5–3 p)	Hurriyya SC

== Quarterfinals ==
- Byes to quarterfinals: Maziya S&RC, New Radiant SC, Club Valencia, VB Sports Club, Victory SC, Club Vyansa
- Second round winners: Club Eagles, Club Riverside

Team 1	Score	Team 2
29 September 2011
New Radiant SC	2–1	Club Eagles
30 September 2011
Club Vyansa	w/o	VB Sports Club
1 October 2011
Club Valencia	1–2	Maziya S&RC
2 October 2011
Club Riverside	1–7	Victory SC

== Semifinals ==
Team 1	Score	Team 2
26 October 2011
New Radiant SC	1–2	VB Sports Club
27 October 2011
Maziya S&RC	2–1	Victory SC

== Third place match ==
Team 1	Score	Team 2
30 October 2011
New Radiant SC	1–3	Victory SC

== Final ==
Team 1	Score	Team 2
31 October 2011
VB Sports Club	6–4 (aet)	Maziya S&RC
