= 2009 Dhivehi League =

Dhivehi League
- Season: 2009
- Champions: VB Sports Club; 1st Dhivehi League title
- AFC Cup: VB Sports Club

Statistics of the Maldives 2009 Wataniya Dhivehi League

== Dhivehi League ==
Pos	Team	Pld	W	D	L	GF	GA	GD	Pts	Qualification
1	VB Sports Club	18	13	4	1	69	15	+54	43	2010 AFC Cup; President's Cup (Note: Victory SC qualified for the 2010 AFC Cup as 2009 Maldives FA Cup winners.)
2	Victory Sports Club	18	11	3	4	39	23	+16	36	2010 AFC Cup; President's Cup
3	Maaziya SRC	18	9	4	5	47	23	+24	31	President's Cup
4	New Radiant SC	18	6	5	7	31	33	−2	23	President's Cup
5	All Youth Linkage FC	18	4	8	6	33	33	0	20	Promotion/relegation playoff (Note: unclear why Vyansa did not enter the Dhivehi League (but they entered the Promotion/relegation playoff))
6	Club Valencia	18	4	4	10	30	37	−7	16	Promotion/relegation playoff
7	Kalhaidhoo ZJ	18	1	2	15	9	94	−85	5	Promotion/relegation playoff

== 2010 Dhivehi League promotion/relegation play-off ==
Pos	Team	Pld	W	D	L	GF	GA	GD	Pts	Qualification
1	All Youth Linkage FC	4	3	1	0	9	4	+5	10	2010 Dhivehi League
2	Vyansa	4	3	0	1	18	9	+9	9	2010 Dhivehi League
3	Club Valencia	4	2	0	2	13	5	+8	6	2010 Dhivehi League
4	Kalhaidhoo ZJ	4	1	0	3	9	21	−12	3	2010 Dhivehi League
5	Club Eagles	4	0	1	3	2	12	−10	1	

Source: rsssf.com
