= Maldivian Second Division Football Tournament =

- Country: Maldives
- Number of clubs: 16
- Level on pyramid: 2
- Promotion to: Premier League
- Relegation to: Third Division
- Domestic cup: FA Cup
- Current champions: Odi Sports Club
- Broadcaster(s): Television Maldives

The FAM Second Division is a football league in the Maldives, organized by the Football Association of Maldives. It is the second division of Maldivian football.

== Structure ==
Changes were brought to the second division league structure on 23 December 2014, by the FAM's FIFA normalizing committee.

The division now consists of 10 clubs and two rounds are played. All teams play against each other once in the first round and the top five clubs will be qualified for the second round. These five clubs play against each other once. The club with most points is declared as champion, and promoted to the Dhivehi Premier League. The runner up will be qualified for the play-off match between the Dhivehi Premier League 9th position team for a spot in the next season's Premier League. The bottom two teams (9th and 10th) are relegated to the third division.

== Teams ==
A total of 10 teams contest in the league, including two promoted from the third division, one relegated from premier league, and the winner of the play-off between premier league 7th and second division 2nd sides.

On 11 February 2015, the Football Association of Maldives announced that from the 2015 season onwards, Maldives national under-19 football team would compete in the second division.

== Winners ==
- 2007: Club All Youth Linkage
- 2008: Red Line Club
- 2009: Vyansa
- 2010: Dhivehi Sifainge Club
- 2011: Hurriyya Sports Club
- 2012: BG Sports Club
- 2013: Sports Club Mecano
- 2014: TC Sports Club
- 2015: United Victory
- 2016: Club Green Streets
- 2017: Club Zefrol
- 2018: Da Grande Sports Club
- 2019: Not held
- 2020: Club Valencia
- 2022: Buru Sports Club
- 2023–24: Masodi Sports Club
- 2026 Malé Region League 2026: Biss Buru Sports Club

== See also ==
- List of football clubs in Maldives
