= President's Cup (Maldives) =

First football tournament in the Maldives

- Founded: 1946; 80 years ago
- Region: Maldives
- Teams: 4
- Current champions: Odi Sports Club
- Most championships: Victory Sports Club

President's Cup (known before 2005 as the National Championship) is said to be the first football tournament in the Maldives and the birth of football in the Maldives. The first tournament was held in 1946, with Customs and Naadhee Ahthamadhun sharing the trophy. The current format of the President's Cup allows only the top four teams of the Dhivehi Premier League to participate.

== Winners ==
=== Maldives National Championship ===
- 1974: ASA Nooraaneemaage
- 1985: Victory Sports Club
- 1986: Victory Sports Club beat New Radiant SC
- 1993: Club Valencia
- 1996: Victory Sports Club
- 1997: New Radiant SC
- 1999: Club Valencia
- 2000: Victory Sports Club
- 2002: Victory Sports Club
- 2003: Victory Sports Club
- 2004: New Radiant SC

=== President's Cup ===
- 2005: Victory Sports Club
- 2006: Victory Sports Club
- 2007: New Radiant SC
- 2008: Club Valencia
- 2009: Victory Sports Club
- 2010: VB Sports
- 2011: Victory Sports Club
- 2012: New Radiant SC
- 2013: New Radiant SC
- 2014: New Radiant SC
- 2015: Maziya S&RC
- 2016: Club Eagles
- 2017: New Radiant SC
- 2021–22: Club Valencia
- 2023: Maziya S&RC
- 2026: Odi Sports Club
