= Thoddoo FC =

Maldivian football club

Thoddoo
- Full name: Thoddoo Football Club
- Nickname: Kalhaidhoo ZJ
- Ground: Rasmee Dhandu Stadium; Malé, Maldives
- Capacity: 11,000
- League: Dhiraagu Dhivehi League
- 2012: Dhivehi League,

Thoddoo Football Club is a football club based in Maldives that plays in the Dhiraagu Dhivehi League.

== Stadium ==
Currently the team plays at the 11,000 seater Rasmee Dhandu Stadium.

== League participations ==
- Dhivehi League: 2009–10
- Second Division Football Tournament: 2010–11

== Notable players ==
- Ahmed Zaad
- Moosa Yaamin
- Mohamed Nizam
