= Ahmed Numaan =

Maldivian footballer

Personal information
- Date of birth: 10 November 1992 (age 33)
- Place of birth: K. Guraidhoo, Maldives
- Position: Defender

Team information
- Current team: Odi Sports Club
- Number: 3

Senior career*
| Years | Team | Apps | (Gls) |
| 2011–2012 | BG Sports Club | | |
| 2013–2022 | Club Eagles | | |
| 2017 | → Thinadhoo (loan) | | |
| 2023–2024 | Maziya | | |
| 2025– | Odi Sports Club | 0 | (0) |
| 2026 | → Atolls Football Club (loan) | 6 | (0) |

International career
| 2012–2014 | Maldives U23 | | |
| 2014– | Maldives | 24 | (0) |
- * Club domestic league appearances and goals

Ahmed Numaan (born 10 November 1992), also known as Helmet, is a Maldivian professional footballer who plays as a defender for Odi Sports Club and Maldives national team.

== Club career ==
Numaan started his career with Maldivian third division side B.G. Sports Club in 2011. He played a vital role in the club's defense, gaining two promotions in continuous years to reach the first division.

In December 2012, Numaan joined Dhivehi League side Club Eagles for the 2013 season. On 28 February 2013, Numaan made his competitive debut in their season opener against his former club BG Sports, helping Eagles to a 4–2 victory.

On 18 August 2016, during the goalless draw against T.C. Sports Club in Dhivehi Premier League, he tore his ACL. After recovery, he continued to train with Eagles after being away from football for 10 months and 23 days, in July 2017.

During mid 2017, Numaan joined Thindadhoo on loan, for the 2017 Dhivehi Premier League. He helped Thinadhoo to qualify for the President's Cup, finish at fourth on the league table.

Numaan left Club Eagles and joined Maziya on 6 February 2023.

== International career ==
=== Youth ===
Numaan has represented Maldives at under-23 level. He received his first all up from coach István Urbányi for the 2012 H.E. Mahinda Rajapaksa Under-23 International Football Trophy. He played in all the matches of the campaign in which Maldives won the tournament. In 2013, Numaan won bronze with Maldives under-23 in 2013 MNC Cup. He also represented Maldives at the 2014 Asian Games.

=== Senior ===
Numaan received his first senior call-up for the 2014 AFC Challenge Cup by Croatian coach Drago Mamić. But he was an unused sub on bench throughout the tournament, where they won Bronze.

He was withdrawn from national selection due to various injury issues, before making his debut for the Red Snappers on 23 March 2018, at the National Stadium, Singapore, as a 84th-minute substitute for Mujuthaaz Mohamed in a friendly game where they lost 3–2 to Singapore.

On 2 September 2020, he was included in Petar Segrt's 20-man squad for the 2018 SAFF Championship. In the final against India on 15 September, at the Bangabandhu National Stadium, Numaan came off the bench for the injured captain Akram Abdul Ghanee in the 39th-minute where Maldives won their second SAFF Championship title.

== Personal life ==
Numaan was born in Guraidhoo, Kaafu Atoll, on 10 November 1992. He has a younger brother, Mohamed Naim, who is also a professional footballer.

Numaan married his girlfriend Mariyam Sana on 17 November 2018.

== Honours ==
BG Sports Club

- Third Division runner-up: 2011
- Second Division: 2012

Club Eagles

- FA Cup third place: 2013
- President's Cup: 2016; runner-up 2014
- Malé League runner-up: 2018
- Dhivehi Premier League runner-up: 2019–20

Atolls Football Club

- Third Division runner-up: 2026

Maldives

- AFC Challenge Cup bronze: 2014
- SAFF Championship: 2018

Maldives U23

- Rajapaksa International Trophy gold: 2012
- MNC Cup bronze: 2013

Individual

- Haveeru Under 21 Best Player: 2013
