= Rilwan Waheed =

Maldivian footballer

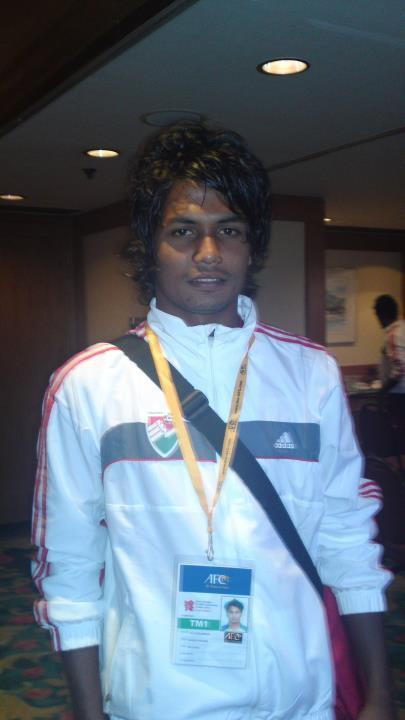
- Riley at Maldives-U23 team's Hong Kong trip for 2012 Summer Olympics Qualifiers match against Hong Kong-U23

Personal information
- Full name: Rilwan Waheed
- Place of birth: Male', Maldives
- Height: 1.77 m (5 ft 9 1/2 in)
- Position: Winger

Team information
- Current team: Buru Sports
- Number: 8

Youth career
- 2002–03: Iskandhar School
- 2004–05: Dharumavantha School
- 2012: Victory

Senior career*
Years	Team	Apps	(Gls)
2006–2011	Club Valencia	60	(2)
2012	Victory	16	(0)
2013	New Radiant	17	(0)
2014	Maziya	6	(0)
2015–2016	New Radiant	12	(2)
2016–2017	Victory	1	(0)
2017–2018	New Radiant	7	(1)
2019–2023	Green Streets		
2023	Eagles	1	(0)
2025–2026	Green Streets		
2026–	Buru Sports		

International career^{‡}
2004–2008	Maldives U17	2	(0)
2007–2010	Maldives U19	6	(0)
2010–2013	Maldives U23	17	(1)
2012–	Maldives	18	(0)
- * Club domestic league appearances and goals as of 17/5/24 @ 16:54(AEST) ‡ National team caps and goals as of 23:17, 16 June 2015 (UTC+5)

Rilwan Waheed is a Maldivian professional footballer. Nicknamed "Riley", he plays as a winger for Buru Sports Club and the Maldives national team.

== Club career ==
=== Club Valencia ===
==== 2006 & 2007 season ====
Rilwan signed with Club Valencia at the age of 15 in 2006, but the FAM rules did not allow him to play at senior level football. In the following year 2007, at the age of 16, he started playing in the 1st Division.

He made his debut on 30 July 2007 against New Radiant as a substitute in the second half of the match where they won 1–0.

Rilwan ended his debut season with third in league, runner up in the FA Cup and crowning the Cup Winners' Cup.

==== 2008 season ====
Rilwan was used as a substitute in the season most of the time and featured in a few games. He played his Cup Winners' Cup debut on 16 February, coming on as a 65th-minute substitute for the goal scorer Ubaidhulla Hassan in a 2–1 defeat against New Radiant. Despite the bitter start of the season with two losses in the Cup Winners Cup and starting from the bench in the second half in both matches they played against New Radiant SC in the group stage, Rilwan was included in the starting lineup for the quarter-final match of the FA Cup against FC Baaz in which they won 8–0 and scored two goals.

Rilwan played his first league match of the season on 25 June against VB Sports Club coming in to play in the second half, coming on for Ahmed Nashid in the 59th minute where they lost the match 3–2. He played his first full match in the league that season on 19 July in the 3–1 win against Thinadhoo ZC. He was also cautioned in that match. On 30 August, Club Valencia won the 2008 Dhivehi League title and Rilwan came in to play as a substitute in the final match against New Radiant in which they won the match 2–1.

On 15 September, Rilwan played his first ever President's Cup final against Victory Sports Club and they went on winning the match 3–2. Mohamed Rifau scored the winning goal from a diving header by a cross provided by Rilwan.

==== 2009 season ====
Rilwan started the 2009 season as a first team player, on 29 January in the Charity Shield match against VB Sports Club where they went on to win the game by 2–1.

On 5 May, Rilwan scored his first ever AFC Cup goal on his debut against Provincial Electricity Authority of Thailand in the 4–1 away defeat from a penalty when he was just 18 years old.

He was involved in three league goals in the season. His first contribution was to assist Ibrahim Shiyam to score against Kalhaidhoo, on 9 July. He was also sent-off with a second caution for a hand ball inside the penalty area, resulting in a penalty for the opposition team. On 10 September, Rilwan provided assists for captain Mohamed Jameel and Ahmed Thariq, one for each in their 3–2 win against All Youth Linkage, their last league game of the season.

==== 2010 season ====
On 25 April, Rilwan was sent off for a slap on Mukhthar Naseer's face during the 1–1 draw league game against Victory. Rilwan scored his first ever league goal on 16 May against Vyansa to put his side 1–0 up, by a thunderbolt shot out from the middle of the opposition half which hit the post before finding the back of the net. The game ended with a 3–0 victory. On 17 July, Rilwan was again sent off for making a harsh tackle against Ali Umar inside the penalty box and giving away a penalty for VB Sports Club, ending the match with a 3–1 defeat.

Rilwan missed two of his penalties in the penalty shoot-out during the FA Cup 2010. On 30 September, his first spot kick was saved by Maziya goalkeeper Ahmed Athif in the quarter-finals but won the shoot-out by 3–1 after match ended as a 1–1 draw after 120 minutes. He missed his second penalty, which went wide against Victory in the semi-finals, on 5 October. They lost the shoot-out by 4–1 after 2–2 at the end of extra time.

==== 2011 season ====
In his last season for Valencia, he made 14 league appearances with one goal. His last goal for the club was scored on 18 September against Maziya in the final league game, scoring the equalizing goal in the 1–1 draw.

=== Victory Sports Club ===
==== 2012 season ====
Rilwan signed for Victory Sports Club at the age of 20 and the team management decided to include him in the club's 2012 FAM Youth Championship as the captain. They crowned the under-21 champions for the first time and Rilwan scored one goal in the competition against Club Eagles from a spot kick in a semi final match, where they lost 2–1.

Rilwan made his senior debut for Victory on 18 February 2012 in the 2012 AFC Cup qualifying play-off. They lost the match 3–4 to Yemen's Al-Tilal. Victory's second goal of the match was scored by captain Shafiu Ahmed, a header from a corner kick cross taken by Rilwan.

In his first season playing for Victory, he made 16 appearances in the League and ended the season as runners-up. They were also the runners-up of President's Cup, losing 2–1 to New Radiant where Rilwan failed to score in the penalty shoot-out, and Charity Shield losing 1–0 to VB Addu FC in the extra time.

=== New Radiant Sports Club ===
==== 2013 season ====
On 24 October 2013, Rilwan agreed to join New Radiant under two-year contract. He was assigned the number 8 shirt.

Rilwan made his debut for New Radiant in the MILO Charity Shield match where they won 3–1 against Maziya on 21 February 2013.

Rilwan had an impressive and also one of the successful season with New Radiant in 2013. He was a part of the squad which won the domestic quadruple in the Maldives with a remarkable 100% winning record for the first time in the Maldives. He won his first FA Cup in the 2013 season, along with the 2013 Dhivehi League, 2013 President's Cup and the 2013 Charity Shield. Rilwan also played in the 2013 AFC Cup in which they reached the quarter-finals.

On 14 January 2014, New Radiant terminated the contract with Rilwan, with one year remaining, due to an argument with their captain Imran Mohamed during a practice session where Rilwan used offensive and abusive language towards Imran in front of other teammates and supporters. Rilwan was also fined by one month salary and asked to apologize the coach and his teammates during the month of May 2013, for actively participating in a futsal tournament held in Malaysia without the approval from the club.

=== Maziya Sports & Recreation Club ===
==== 2014 season ====
On 15 January 2014, the following day Rilwan's contract with New Radiant was terminated, he signed a one-year deal with Maziya Sports & Recreation Club.

On 11 March 2014, Rilwan made his Maziya debut in the 2014 AFC Cup group stage match against Selangor of Malaysia, where they managed to get a point with a 1–1 draw at home. He was sent off during his first league game of the season, where the match ended 2–2 against B.G. Sports Club on 19 June with two cautions. He missed one match due to suspension and played his next match against his former club Victory, on 6 July and provided two assists; for Ashad Ali and Riste Naumov. The match ended with huge 5–1 win.

On 3 August 2014, during the 1–0 league win against his former club New Radiant, his knee got injured and was out for approximately three months.

=== Return to New Radiant Sports Club ===
==== 2015 season ====
On 18 December 2014, Rilwan completed his return to the club and signed a two-year contract and claimed his number 8 shirt.

Rilwan made his official return debut against Lao Toyota FC in the 2015 AFC Cup on 11 March 2015, coming into play as a substitute at half-time. They won the match by 2–1. On 20 April, Rilwan was sent-off in the first league game of the season against Victory, where they won by 3–1, after the foul he committed to Ahmed Ziyan. He was later suspended for two league games with a fine of MVR 4000 regarding the incident. On 8 July 2015, during his first game after returning from suspension, Rilwan conceded a penalty for a handball against Valencia, but won the game by 3–1. Rilwan scored his first New Radiant goal, on 16 July against Club Eagles, taking the lead in the fourth minute but ending the match with a 1–1 draw. On 26 September, Rilwan scored the opening goal again, against Club Eagles but this time in the President's Cup semi-finals. They ended the match with a 2–1 win, advancing to the President's Cup final. Rilwan scored his second league goal against Maziya on 20 October, where he scored the only goal of the match, collecting Mohamed Rasheed's long through ball inside the penalty box and volleyed it over goalkeeper Pavel Matyash.

==== 2016 season ====
On 22 February 2016, Rilwan was assigned as the joint vice captain of New Radiant with Ahmed Niyaz, under the captaincy of Mohamed Rasheed.

On 23 February, Rilwan scored in the season debut against Balestier Khalsa in the 2016 AFC Cup group stage match. He came into play as a substitute in the 69th minute and scored in the dying second of the game to level the score 2–2.

== International career ==
=== Under-23 ===
Rilwan was preceded as the captain of the Maldives national under-23 football team till the mid-2012 but later his captaincy was succeeded by Hassan Adhuham in the 2012 Rajapaksa International Trophy and he was given the vice-captaincy of the team. Rilwan scored the opening goal from a free kick and supplied a good long through ball to Asadhulla who curled in to the goal to score the second, in the 2012 Rajapaksa International Trophy Final against Pakistan to win Maldives national under-23 football team's first ever gold medal.

=== Senior team ===
Rilwan made his debut in a friendly match against Thailand on February 24, 2012

2012 AFC Challenge Cup was his first major tournament with the senior team and he played all the matches as a right back at 2012 AFC Challenge Cup for the Maldives. Their first goal of the tournament came with a header from a cross by Rilwan in to the penalty area of Turkmenistan. After the great performance in the tournament, he was one of the most hopeful young players in the Maldives, and also included in the Haveeru Sports Awards' best 5 players of 2012 AFC Challenge Cup. He is the only Maldivian player nominated for the 2012 AFC Challenge Cup's best Under-21 player Award.

Despite being with minor injuries, national coach István Urbányi decided to include Rilwan in the 20 men squad for the 2013 SAFF Championship. He only featured in the game against Bhutan in the group stage match where they won 8–2, replacing Shafiu Ahmed for the final 10 minutes.

== Career statistics ==
=== Club ===
As of match played 18 May 2016

Season	Club	Division	League			FA Cup			President's Cup			Charity Shield			Others			Asia			Total		
Season	Club	Division	Apps	Goals	Assists	Apps	Goals	Assists	Apps	Goals	Assists	Apps	Goals	Assists	Apps	Goals	Assists	Apps	Goals	Assists	Apps	Goals	Assists
2007	Valencia	Dhivehi League	12	0	0	3	1	0	1	0	0	–			5^{1}	3	1	–			21	4	1
2008	Valencia	Dhivehi League	6	0	0	3	2	0	2	0	1	–			2^{1}	0	0	–			13	2	1
2009	Valencia	Dhivehi League	14	0	3	1	0	0	–			1	0	0	–			2	1	0	18	1	0
2010	Valencia	Dhivehi League	14	1	6	3	0	0	–			–			–			–			17	1	6
2011	Valencia	Dhivehi League	14	1	1	1	0	0	–			–			–			–			15	1	1
Valencia total			60	2	10	11	3	0	3	0	1	1	0	0	7	3	1	2	1	0	84	9	9
2012	Victory	Dhivehi League	16	0	3	2	0	0	3	0	0	1	0	0	1^{2}	0	1	–			23	0	4
Victory total			16	0	3	2	0	0	3	0	0	1	0	0	1	0	1	–			23	0	4
2013	New Radiant	Dhivehi League	17	0	1	2	0	0	2	0	0	1	0	0	0	0	0	7	0	1	29	0	2
New Radiant total			17	0	1	2	0	0	2	0	0	1	0	0	0	0	0	7	0	1	29	0	2
2014	Maziya	Dhivehi League	6	0	2	0	0	0	0	0	0	1	0	0	0	0	0	4	0	0	11	0	2
Maziya total			6	0	2	0	0	0	0	0	0	1	0	0	0	0	0	4	0	0	11	0	2
2015	New Radiant	Premier League	9	2	3	–			5	1	1	1	0	0	3^{3}	0	0	5	0	0	23	3	4
2016	New Radiant	Premier League	3	0	0	0	0	0	0	0	0	1	0	0	–			6	1	0	10	1	0
New Radiant total			12	2	3	0	0	0	5	1	1	2	0	0	3	0	0	11	1	0	33	4	4
Career total			111	4	19	15	3	0	13	1	2	6	0	0	11	3	2	24	2	1	180	13	21

- 1.Maldivian Cup Winners Cup.
- 2.2012 AFC Cup qualifying play-off.
- 3.2015 POMIS Cup.

=== International ===
National team	Season	Apps	Goals
Maldives U17	2004	0	0
Maldives U17	2005	2	0
Maldives U17	2006	0	0
Maldives U17	2007	0	0
Maldives U17	2008	0	0
Total		2	0
Maldives U19	2007	6	0
Maldives U19	2008	0	0
Maldives U19	2009	0	0
Maldives U19	2010	0	0
Total		6	0
Maldives U23	2010	2	0
Maldives U23	2011	2	0
Maldives U23	2012	11	1
Maldives U23	2013	2	0
Total		17	1
Maldives	2012	7	0
Maldives	2013	3	0
Maldives	2014	5	0
Maldives	2015	3	0
Total		18	0

==== International goals ====
===== Under–23 =====
Scores and results list Maldives U–23's goal tally first.

#	Date	Venue	Opponent	Score	Result	Competition
1.	9 November 2012	Jayathilake Sports Complex, Sri Lanka	Pakistan	0–1	1–2	2012 M. Rajapaksa Int'l Trophy Final

== Awards and honours ==
Valencia

- Dhivehi League: 2008
- President's Cup: 2008
- FA Charity Shield: 2009
- Maldives Cup Winners' Cup: 2007

Victory Youth

- Youth Championship: 2012

New Radiant

- FA Charity Shield: 2013
- Dhivehi League: 2013
- Dhivehi Premier League: 2015
- Maldives FA Cup: 2013
- President's Cup: 2013

Maziya

- Maldives FA Cup: 2014

Maldives U–23

- Rajapaksa International Trophy: 2012

Individual

- 2012 Haveeru Sports Award for the best Under–23 footballer.
