= Hassan Raif Ahmed =

Maldivian footballer

Hanna
Personal information
- Full name: Hassan Raif Ahmed
- Date of birth: 30 January 1998 (age 28)
- Place of birth: S. Hithadhoo, Maldives
- Position: Forward

Team information
- Current team: New Radiant
- Number: 11

Youth career
- 2016–2019: Club Eagles

Senior career*
Years	Team	Apps	(Gls)
2015	S. Hithadhoo FT		
2016–2022	Club Eagles		
2023–2025	Maziya		
2025–	New Radiant		

International career^{‡}
2019	Maldives U23	4	(0)
2021–	Maldives	18	(3)
- * Club domestic league appearances and goals as of 27 August 2025 ‡ National team caps and goals as of 25 March 2025

Hassan Raif Ahmed (born 30 January 1998) nicknamed Hanna, is a Maldivian footballer who plays as a right-winger for New Radiant and Maldives national team.

== Club career ==
Raif first attracted attention during the 2015 Minivan Championship, where his performances on the right flank for S. Hithadhoo FT stood out to major clubs in the Maldives, particularly Club Eagles. Although Eagles attempted to sign him that year, the deal did not go through.

In 2016, Raif underwent a trial with TC Sports Club, but chose to join Club Eagles. He was a key member of the club’s youth setup. He helped lead the squad to three FAM Youth Championship titles, captaining the team in his final winning campaign with the youth squad.

Raif made his Dhivehi Premier League debut in the 2016 season. He notably featured in the 2016 President’s Cup final, where Club Eagles defeated TC Sports Club 1–0 in extra time — the club’s first major trophy in their history.

In 2021, Raif played with Club Eagles in the AFC Cup qualifying play-offs, gaining his first exposure to continental club football.

On 5 February 2023, Raif joined Maziya. He made his full debut in AFC club competitions with Maziya on 19 September 2023, starting in the 2023–24 AFC Cup group stage opener against Bashundhara Kings at the National Football Stadium in Malé. Maziya won the match 3–1.

== International career ==
In 2018, Raif was included in the provisional squad for the SAFF Championship under Croatian head coach Petar Šegrt, but was not selected in the final 23-man squad for the tournament, where the Maldives eventually emerged as champions.

In 2021, he was expected to be part of the Maldives squad for the FIFA World Cup 2022 Asian Qualifiers. However, he couldn't travel with the squad after testing positive for COVID-19 during the preparations.

Later that same year, Raif was included in Ali Suzain's squad for the 2021 SAFF Championship, held in Malé. He made his international debut on 10 October 2021, coming on as a 73rd-minute substitute for Hamza Mohamed in a crucial group-stage match against Sri Lanka. Maldives won the game 1–0 at the National Football Stadium.

On 24 March 2022, Raif scored his first international goal in a friendly match against Bangladesh where they won 2–0 at the National Football Stadium.

== Career statistics ==
=== International ===
As of match played 24 March 2025

Appearances and goals by national team and year
National team	Year	Apps	Goals
Maldives	2021	2	0
Maldives	2022	8	3
Maldives	2023	4	0
Maldives	2024	2	0
Maldives	2025	2	0
Total		18	3

As of match played 25 March 2025
Maldives score listed first, score column indicates score after each Raif goal

List of international goals scored by Hassan Raif Ahmed
No.	Date	Venue	Cap	Opponent	Score	Result	Competition	Ref.
1	24 March 2022	National Football Stadium, Malé, Maldives	3	Bangladesh	1–0	2–0	Friendly	
2	21 September 2022	Track and Field Sports Complex, Bandar Seri Begawan, Brunei	7	Brunei	3–0	3–0	Friendly	
3	24 September 2022	Track and Field Sports Complex, Bandar Seri Begawan, Brunei	8	Laos	1–0	3–1	Friendly	

== Honours ==
Club Eagles Youth

- FAM Youth Championship: 2016, 2017, 2019

Club Eagles

- President's Cup: 2016
- Charity Shield: 2020

Maziya

- Dhivehi Premier League: 2023
- President's Cup: 2023
- Charity Shield: 2023

Individual

- Mihaaru Sports Awards Best U21 Footballer: 2019
