= 2013 Maldives FA Cup final =

- Event: 2013 Maldives FA Cup
Maziya	New Radiant
0	1
- Date: 4 October 2013
- Venue: Rasmee Dhandu Stadium, Malé

The 2013 Maldives FA Cup final is the 26th Final of the Maldives FA Cup.

== Route to the final ==
Maziya
QF	Maziya	1–0	Valencia
SF	Maziya	6–1	Club AYL

New Radiant
QF	New Radiant	2–0^{*}	Victory
SF	New Radiant	3–0	Eagles

* Victory Sports Club withdraw from 2013 FA Cup and the match awarded New Radiant a 2–0 win.

== Match ==
=== Details ===
4 October 2013
21:15 UTC+5

Maziya	0–1	New Radiant
	Report	23' Mansa

Rasmee Dhandu Stadium, Malé

Maziya	New Radiant

GK	25	(Maldives) Mohamed Imran
LB	19	(Maldives) Mohamed Rasheed
CB	20	(Maldives) Ali Imran
CB	17	(Maldives) Shafiu Ahmed
RB	30	(Bulgaria) Zhivko Dinev	(yellow card) 66'
CM	14	(Maldives) Ahmed Mohamed (c)
CF	6	(Maldives) Mohamed Arif
AM	5	(Maldives) Ahmed Nashid		(substituted off) 56'
LF	7	(Maldives) Ibrahim Shiyaam	(yellow card) 57'	(substituted off) 66'
RF	21	(Maldives) Mukhthar Naseer		(substituted off) 83'
CF	32	(Maldives) Assadhulla Abdulla
Substitutes:
FW	12	(Maldives) Ahmed Rasheed		(substituted in) 56'
FW	26	(Bulgaria) Yavor Vandev	(yellow card) 80'	(substituted in) 66'
FW	29	(Bulgaria) Rumen Georgiev Aleksandrov		(substituted in) 83'
Manager:
(Maldives) Ismail Mahfooz

GK	25	(Maldives) Imran Mohamed (c)
RB	8	(Maldives) Rilwan Waheed	(yellow card) 62'
CB	2	(Nigeria) Kingsley Chukwudi Nkurumeh
CB	3	(Maldives) Mohamed Shifan
LB	4	(Maldives) Ahmed Abdulla
DM	23	(Maldives) Ahmed Niyaz		(substituted off) 70'
CM	11	(Guinea) Sylla Mansa
AM	13	(Maldives) Akram Abdul Ghanee
SS	37	(Maldives) Mohammad Umair		(substituted off) 90'
SS	5	(Maldives) Ali Fasir	(yellow card) 84'	(substituted off) 90+2'
CF	7	(Maldives) Ali Ashfaq
Substitutes:
DF	6	(Ghana) Yusif Nurudeen		(substituted in) 70'
FW	10	(Maldives) Ali Umar		(substituted in) 90'
MF	15	(Maldives) Ismail Easa		(substituted in) 90+2'
Manager:
(Bulgaria) Velizar Popov

Match rules

- 90 minutes.
- 30 minutes of extra-time if necessary.
- Penalty shoot-out if scores still level.
- Maximum of three substitutions.

== See also ==
- 2013 Maldives FA Cup
