= 2013 FAM Youth Championship =

FAM Youth Championship
Tournament details
- Country: Maldives
- Teams: 12

Final positions
- Champions: Club Valencia
- Runners-up: BG Sports Club

Tournament statistics
- Matches played: 25
- Goals scored: 85 (3.4 per match)
- Top goal scorer: Mohamed Muslih (6 goals)

The 2013 FAM Youth Championship, includes the youth teams of all the Dhivehi League teams and 4 other teams from any part of the Maldives who want to participate (Mahibadhoo Sports Club, Kelaa Naalhi Sports, Eydhafushi Zuvaanunge Club and Club Green Street). The age group of this tournament is Under-21.

== Participated Teams ==
It was announced that only 10 teams can participate in the competition but later, the Football Association of Maldives decided to give permission for all the teams who wants to participate, in order to give more young stars to show their capability in the tournament.

=== Group 1 ===
- Maziya Sports & Recreation Club
- Club All Youth Linkage
- VB Addu Football Club
- Eydhafushi Zuvaanunge Club

=== Group 2 ===
- Victory Sports Club
- Club Valencia
- New Radiant Sports Club
- BG Sports Club

=== Group 3 ===
- Club Eagles
- Mahibadhoo Sports Club
- Kelaa Naalhi Sports
- Club Green Streets

== Group stage ==
Times are Indian Ocean, Maldives (UTC+5).

=== Group 1 ===
| Team | Pld | W | D | L | GF | GA | GD | Pts |
|---|---|---|---|---|---|---|---|---|
| Maziya | 3 | 2 | 1 | 0 | 6 | 3 | +3 | 7 |
| VB Addu FC | 3 | 2 | 0 | 1 | 3 | 3 | 0 | 6 |
| Eydhafushi Zuvaanunge Club | 3 | 1 | 0 | 2 | 4 | 4 | 0 | 3 |
| All Youth Linkage | 3 | 0 | 1 | 2 | 2 | 5 | −3 | 1 |

| 10 January 2013 | Maziya | 1−1 | All Youth Linkage | Rasmee Dhandu Stadium, Malé |
| 16:00 | Ali Ibrahim 59' (pen.) | Report | 17' Ahmed Haleem |

| 11 January 2013 | VB Addu FC | 1−0 | Eydhafushi Zuvaanunge Club | Rasmee Dhandu Stadium, Malé |
| 16:00 | Ahmed Sujau 41' | Report |

| 17 January 2013 | Maziya | 3−1 | VB Addu FC | Rasmee Dhandu Stadium, Malé |
| 16:00 | Ali Ibrahim 18', 90+2' (pen.); Ali Saamin 45' | Report (in Dhivehi) | 42' Ismail Juhain Zahir |

| 18 January 2013 | All Youth Linkage | 1−3 | Eydhafushi Zuvaanunge Club | Rasmee Dhandu Stadium, Malé |
| 16:00 | Hussain Ahusan 59'; Aboobakuru Ibrahim (penalty missed) 76' | Report (in Dhivehi); Report | 6', 90', 90+4' (pen.) Mohamed Bassam |

| 25 January 2013 | Maziya | 2−1 | Eydhafushi Zuvaanunge Club | Rasmee Dhandu Stadium, Malé |
| 16:00 | Guraish Abdul Razzaq 41'; Mohamed Falaah Hamid 76' | Report (in Dhivehi) | 57' Fatheen Khalid |

| 26 January 2013 | All Youth Linkage | 0−1 | VB Addu FC | Rasmee Dhandu Stadium, Malé |
| 16:00 | | Report | 45' Affan Hamza |

=== Group 2 ===
| Team | Pld | W | D | L | GF | GA | GD | Pts |
|---|---|---|---|---|---|---|---|---|
| Valencia | 3 | 2 | 1 | 0 | 4 | 1 | +3 | 7 |
| New Radiant | 3 | 1 | 1 | 1 | 2 | 3 | −1 | 4 |
| BG Sports Club | 3 | 1 | 0 | 2 | 4 | 4 | 0 | 3 |
| Victory | 3 | 1 | 0 | 2 | 1 | 6 | −5 | 3 |

| 12 January 2013 | Victory | 1−3 | Valencia | Rasmee Dhandu Stadium, Malé |
| 16:00 | Hussain Nihaan 79' (pen.) | Report | 55', 60' Ahmed Visam; 74' Mohamed Faizam |

| 13 January 2013 | New Radiant | 2−1 | BG Sports Club | Rasmee Dhandu Stadium, Malé |
| 16:00 | Ali Jinah 60' (o.g.); Ibrahim Suhail 90' | Report | 44' Mohamed Shabeen Adam |

| 20 January 2013 | Victory | 2−0 | New Radiant | Rasmee Dhandu Stadium, Malé |
| 16:00 | Ali Baasil 61'; Ahmed Humam 78' | Report (in Dhivehi) |

| 21 January 2013 | Valencia | 1−0 | BG Sports Club | Rasmee Dhandu Stadium, Malé |
| 16:00 | Adam Nuhad 83' | Report (in Dhivehi) |

| 27 January 2013 | Victory | 1−3 | BG Sports Club | Rasmee Dhandu Stadium, Malé |
| 16:00 | Ahmed Humam 48' | Report | 46' Ahmed Shafee; 65' Mohamed Shabeen Adam; 79' Mohamed Maleeh |

| 28 January 2013 | Valencia | 0−0 | New Radiant | Rasmee Dhandu Stadium, Malé |
| 16:00 | | Report |

=== Group 3 ===
| Team | Pld | W | D | L | GF | GA | GD | Pts |
|---|---|---|---|---|---|---|---|---|
| Eagles | 3 | 3 | 0 | 0 | 18 | 5 | +13 | 9 |
| Kelaa Naalhi | 3 | 1 | 1 | 1 | 4 | 7 | −3 | 4 |
| Mahibadhoo | 3 | 1 | 1 | 1 | 5 | 8 | −3 | 4 |
| Green Streets | 3 | 0 | 0 | 3 | 3 | 10 | −7 | 0 |

| 15 January 2013 | Eagles | 6−1 | Mahibadhoo | Rasmee Dhandu Stadium, Malé |
| 16:00 | Ahmed Imaaz 2', 33', 88'; Mohamed Thasmeen 31'; Mohamed Muslih 53', 58' | Report | 34' Ali Ayaz |

| 16 January 2013 | Kelaa Naalhi | 1−0 | Green Streets | Rasmee Dhandu Stadium, Malé |
| 16:00 | Hassan Shaheedh 23' | Report |

| 22 January 2013 | Eagles | 5−1 | Kelaa Naalhi | Rasmee Dhandu Stadium, Malé |
| 16:00 | Mohamed Amjad 33'; Mohamed Thashmeen 52', 53', 71'; Mohamed Muslih 61' | Report | 83' (pen.) Migdhadh Saeed |

| 23 January 2013 | Mahibadhoo | 2−0 | Green Streets | Rasmee Dhandu Stadium, Malé |
| 16:00 | Ismail Nazeer 57', 80' | Report | (penalty missed) 68' Ahmed Sajid |

| 30 January 2013 | Eagles | 7−3 | Green Streets | Rasmee Dhandu Stadium, Malé |
| 16:00 | Abdulla Sameeh Moosa 6', 83', 86'; Mohamed Muslih 13', 90+1', 90+3'; Abdulla Saffan 18' | Report (in Dhivehi) | 35' Akuram Idrees; 41', 47' Ahmed Azhan |

| 31 January 2013 | Mahibadhoo | 2−2 | Kelaa Naalhi | Rasmee Dhandu Stadium, Malé |
| 16:00 | Gasim Samaam 88' (pen.); Shuaid Saeed 90+5' | Report | 10' Migdhadh Saeed; 45' Ahmed Shafag |

==== Third placed teams ====
| Group | Team | Pld | W | D | L | GF | GA | GD | Pts |
|---|---|---|---|---|---|---|---|---|---|
| 1 | Mahibadhoo | 3 | 1 | 1 | 1 | 5 | 8 | −3 | 4 |
| 2 | BG Sports Club | 3 | 1 | 0 | 2 | 4 | 4 | 0 | 3 |
| 3 | Eydhafushi Zuvaanunge Club | 3 | 1 | 0 | 2 | 4 | 4 | 0 | 3 |

== Quarter-finals ==
| 3 February 2013 | Maziya | 1−1 (a.e.t.) (2–4 p) | BG Sports Club | Rasmee Dhandu Stadium, Malé |
| 16:00 | Guraish Abdul Razzaq 5' | Report | 54' Ahmed Zaid |
| | Penalties |
| | Hussain Sajid (penalty scored) (penalty missed); Ismail Aleef Ahmed (penalty scored) (penalty missed) | | (penalty scored) Ahmed Aiman; (penalty scored) Ismail Madheeh; (penalty scored) Ali Jinah; (penalty scored) Ahmed Zaid |

| 4 February 2013 | New Radiant | 4−0 | Mahibadhoo | Rasmee Dhandu Stadium, Malé |
| 16:00 | Hassan Muaan 37'; Moosa Yaamin 48' (pen.), 72'; Abdulla Ziham 55' | Report |

| 5 February 2013 | Eagles | 2−2 (a.e.t.) (3–4 p) | VB Addu FC | Rasmee Dhandu Stadium, Malé |
| 16:00 | Ibeahim Mubeen A. R. 12'; Abdulla Sameeh Moosa 90+6' | Report | 45' Ahmed Shujau; 84' Ismail Juhain Zahir |
| | Penalties |
| | Abdulla Sameeh Moosa (penalty scored); Yasfaadh Habeeb (penalty scored); Ibeahim Mubeen A. R. (penalty missed); Hamdhaan Ibrahim (penalty missed); Mohamed Thashmeen (penalty scored) | | (penalty missed) Hussain Zahir; (penalty scored) Ismail Juhain Zahir; (penalty scored) Ahmed Shujau; (penalty scored) Adam Isham; (penalty scored) Ibrahim Rasheed |

| 6 February 2013 | Kelaa Naalhi | 1−4 | Valencia | Rasmee Dhandu Stadium, Malé |
| 16:00 | Hassan Nawaz 28' | Report | 24', 54', 68' Ahmed Visam; 50' (pen.) Abdul Wahid Ibrahim |

== Semi-finals ==
| 9 February 2013 | BG Sports Club | 2−1 | New Radiant | Rasmee Dhandu Stadium, Malé |
| 16:00 | Mohamed Shabeen Adam 32'; Ahmed Zaid 77' | Report | 89' Ibrahim Ushamath |

| 10 February 2013 | VB Addu FC | 3−3 (a.e.t.) (3–4 p) | Valencia | Rasmee Dhandu Stadium, Malé |
| 16:00 | Ahmed Shujau 3', 58'; Ismail Juhain Zahir 76' | Report | 22', 42' Abdul Rahman Mohamed; 24' Abdul Wahid Ibrahim |
| | Penalties |
| | Mohamed Vishah (penalty scored); Hussain Zahir (penalty missed); Ismail Juhain Zahir (penalty scored); Ahmed Shujau (penalty scored); Ibrahim Rasheed (penalty missed) | | (penalty scored) Abdul Wahid Ibrahim; (penalty scored) Muan Moosa Manik; (penalty scored) Ahmed Visam; (penalty scored) Ansar Ibrahim Fulhu |

== Final ==
| 13 February 2013 | BG Sports Club | 0−2 | Valencia | Rasmee Dhandu Stadium, Malé |
| 16:00 | | Report | 46' (66), pen.' Abdul Wahid Ibrahim |

== Statistics ==
=== Top goal scorer ===
- Mohamed Muslih (Club Eagles with 6 goals)

=== Best 4 players ===
- Ahmed Visam (Club Valencia)
- Mohamed Shabeen Adam (BG Sports Club)
- Ahmed Shujau (VB Addu FC)
- Ibrahim Labaan Shareef (Club Valencia)

=== Best coach ===
- Aslam Abdul Raheem (Club Valencia)

=== Fair play team ===
- New Radiant SportsClub

=== Hat-tricks ===
| Player | For | Against | Result | Date |
|---|---|---|---|---|
| (Maldives) Ahmed Imaaz | Eagles | Mahibadhoo | 6–1 | 15 January 2013 |
| (Maldives) Mohamed Bassam | Eydhafushi ZC | All Youth Linkage | 3–1 | 18 January 2013 |
| (Maldives) Mohamed Thashmeen | Eagles | Kelaa Naalhi | 5–1 | 22 January 2013 |
| (Maldives) Abdulla Sameeh Moosa | Eagles | Green Street | 7–3 | 30 January 2013 |
| (Maldives) Mohamed Muslih | Eagles | Green Street | 7–3 | 30 January 2013 |
| (Maldives) Ahmed Visam | Valencia | Kelaa Naalhi | 4–1 | 6 February 2013 |

== Prize money ==
The prize money given to the top two teams:

| Final placing | Prize money (Maldivian rufiyaa) |
|---|---|
| Champions | MVR 20,000 |
| Runner-up | MVR 10,000 |
