= 2014 FAM Youth Championship =

FAM Youth Championship
Tournament details
- Country: Maldives
- Venue: 1
- Dates: 25 January – 20 February
- Teams: 13

The 2014 FAM Youth Championship, known as the eLL Mobile FAM Youth Championship for sponsorship reasons, is the 4th season of the FAM Youth Championship, which includes the youth teams of all the 2014 Dhivehi League teams and 5 other teams from any part of the Maldives who want to participate (Vaikaradhoo Football Club, Veyru Cports Club, Kelaa Naalhi Sports, Eydhafushi Zuvaanunge Club and Club Green Street). The age group of this tournament is Under-21. This tournament is supported by the Japan Football Association.

== Participated Teams ==
It was planned to participate 12 teams in the competition but, the Football Association of Maldives decided to give permission for all the 14 teams who wants to participate, in order to create more young stars. Later, out of the 14 teams, Vilimale' United withdrew from the competition due to an unknown reason.

=== Group 1 ===
- Club Valencia
- Club Eagles
- Mahibadhoo Sports Club
- Victory Sports Club
- Club Green Street

=== Group 2 ===
- New Radiant Sports Club
- Maziya Sports & Recreation Club
- Vaikaradhoo Football Club
- Veyru Sports Club

=== Group 3 ===
- B.G. Sports Club
- Kelaa Naalhi Sports
- Club All Youth Linkage
- Eydhafushi Zuvaanunge Club

=== Personnel ===
Team	Coach	Captain
B.G. Sports Club	(Maldives) TBD TBD	(Maldives) TBD TBD
Club All Youth Linkage	(Maldives) TBD TBD	(Maldives) TBD TBD
Club Eagles	(Maldives) Ahmed Shakir	(Maldives) Hamdhaan Ibrahim
Club Green Street	(Maldives) TBD TBD	(Maldives) TBD TBD
Club Valencia	(Maldives) Hussain Habeeb	(Maldives) Hassaan Rasheed
Eydhafushi Zuvaanunge Club	(Maldives) Mohamed Zahid	(Maldives) Anas Mohamed
Kelaa Nalhi Sports	(Maldives) TBD TBD	(Maldives) TBD TBD
Mahibadhoo Sports Club	(Maldives) Hussain Abbas	(Maldives) Gasim Samaam
Maziya Sports & Recreation Club	(Maldives) TBD TBD	(Maldives) Abdul Wahid Ibrahim
New Radiant Sports Club	(Maldives) Ahmed Niyaz	(Maldives) Hamza Mohamed
Vaikaradhoo Football Club	(Maldives) TBD TBD	(Maldives) TBD TBD
Veyru Sports Club	(Maldives) TBD TBD	(Maldives) TBD TBD
Victory Sports Club	(Maldives) Sabah Mohamed Ibrahim	(Maldives) Hussain Afsal

== Venue ==
All the matches of this edition of Youth Championship is decided to be played at the FAM No: 1 Turf ground due to the renovation work going on in the Galolhu National Stadium for the 2014 AFC Challenge Cup.

Malé
FAM No: 1 Turf ground
Capacity: 300

== Group stage ==
Times are Indian Ocean, Maldives (UTC+5).

=== Group 1 ===
Team	Pld	W	D	L	GF	GA	GD	Pts
Eagles	1	1	0	0	10	0	+10	3
Mahibadhoo	1	1	0	0	1	0	+1	3
Green Street	0	0	0	0	0	0	0	0
Victory	1	0	0	1	0	1	-1	0
Valencia	1	0	0	1	0	10	-10	0

25 January 2014	Valencia	0 − 10	Eagles	FAM No: 1 Turf ground, Malé
16:10		Report (in Dhivehi)	8', 15', 72', 86' Rizuvan; 11' Naufal; 22' Mubeen; 40', 42', 64' Ansar; 90' Muslih

25 January 2014	Mahibadhoo	1 − 0	Victory	FAM No: 1 Turf ground, Malé
21:00	Samaam 79'	Report (in Dhivehi)

−	FAM No: 1 Turf ground, Malé
[ Report]

−	FAM No: 1 Turf ground, Malé
[ Report]

−	FAM No: 1 Turf ground, Malé
[ Report]

−	FAM No: 1 Turf ground, Malé
[ Report]

−	FAM No: 1 Turf ground, Malé
[ Report]

−	FAM No: 1 Turf ground, Malé
[ Report]

=== Group 2 ===
Team	Pld	W	D	L	GF	GA	GD	Pts
New Radiant	0	0	0	0	0	0	0	0
Maziya	0	0	0	0	0	0	0	0
Vaikaradhoo	0	0	0	0	0	0	0	0
Veyru	0	0	0	0	0	0	0	0

26 January 2014	New Radiant	4 − 3	Maziya	FAM No: 1 Turf ground, Malé
16:10	Ahmed Hassan 3'; Hamza Mohamed 6', 90+7'; Majdhaan Solih 56'	Report; Report (in Dhivehi); Report (NRSC); Report (ET)	28', 61' Mohamed Irufaan; 51' Abdulla Waaziu

26 January 2014	Vaikaradhoo	2 − 1	Veyru	FAM No: 1 Turf ground, Malé
21:00	Ali Areesh 63'; Ahmed Naseem 83'	Report (in Dhivehi)	70' Ali Shaam

−	FAM No: 1 Turf ground, Malé
[ Report]

−	FAM No: 1 Turf ground, Malé
[ Report]

−	FAM No: 1 Turf ground, Malé
[ Report]

−	FAM No: 1 Turf ground, Malé
[ Report]

=== Group 3 ===
Team	Pld	W	D	L	GF	GA	GD	Pts
All Youth Linkage	2	1	1	0	3	2	+1	4
Eydhafushi Zuvaanunge Club	2	1	0	1	3	2	+1	3
Kelaa Naalhi	2	1	0	1	1	2	-1	3
BG Sports Club	2	0	1	1	1	2	-1	1

27 January 2014	BG Sports Club	0 − 1	Kelaa Naalhi	FAM No: 1 Turf ground, Malé
16:10		Report; Report (in Dhivehi)	73' (pen.) Harish Rasheed

27 January 2014	All Youth Linkage	2 − 1	Eydhafushi Zuvaanunge Club	FAM No: 1 Turf ground, Malé
21:00		[ Report]

−	FAM No: 1 Turf ground, Malé
[ Report]

−	FAM No: 1 Turf ground, Malé
[ Report]

−	FAM No: 1 Turf ground, Malé
[ Report]

−	FAM No: 1 Turf ground, Malé
[ Report]

==== Third placed teams ====
Group	Team	Pld	W	D	L	GF	GA	GD	Pts
TBD	TBD	0	0	0	0	0	0	0	0
TBD	TBD	0	0	0	0	0	0	0	0
TBD	TBD	0	0	0	0	0	0	0	0

== Quarter-finals ==
−	FAM No: 1 Turf ground, Malé
[ Report]

−	FAM No: 1 Turf ground, Malé
[ Report]

−	FAM No: 1 Turf ground, Malé
[ Report]

−	FAM No: 1 Turf ground, Malé
[ Report]

== Semi-finals ==
−	FAM No: 1 Turf ground, Malé
[ Report]

−	FAM No: 1 Turf ground, Malé
[ Report]

== Final ==
20 February	Eagles	1 − 0	Maziya	FAM No: 1 Turf ground, Malé
16:00	Mohamed Muslih ?'	Report (DV)

== Season statistics ==
=== Goal scorers ===
4 goals

- (Eagles) Ahmed Rizuvan

3 goals

- (Eagles) Ansar Ibrahim

1 goal

- (Eagles) Ahmed Naufal
- (Eagles) Ibrahim Mubeen Ahmed Rasheed
- (Eagles) Mohamed Muslih
- (Mahibadhoo) Gasim Samaam

=== Hat-tricks ===
Player	For	Against	Result	Date
(Maldives) Ahmed Rizuvan^{4}	Eagles	Valencia	10–0	25 January 2014
(Maldives) Ansar Ibrahim	Eagles	Valencia	10–0	25 January 2014

^{4} Player scored 4 goals

=== Clean sheets ===
==== Player ====
Rank	Player	Club	Clean sheets
1	(Maldives) Nihad Nasir	Eagles	1
1	(Maldives) Ibrahim Arushadh	Mahibadhoo	1

==== Club ====
- Most clean sheets: 1
  - Eagles
  - Mahibadhoo
- Fewest clean sheets: 1
  - Valencia
  - Victory

=== Discipline ===
==== Player ====
- Most yellow cards: 1
  - Riham Abdul Ganee (Eagles)
  - Hussain Afsal (Victory)
- Most red cards: 0

==== Club ====
- Most yellow cards: 1
  - Eagles
  - Victory
- Most red cards: 0
