= 2012 FAM Youth Championship =

FAM Youth Championship
Tournament details
- Country: Maldives
- Teams: 10

Final positions
- Champions: Victory SC (1st title)
- Runner-up: Club Eagles

Tournament statistics
- Matches played: 24
- Goals scored: 79 (3.29 per match)

The 2012 FAM Youth Championship, includes the youth teams of all the Dhivehi League teams and two other teams from any part of the Maldives who want to participate (Mahibadhoo Sports Club and Kelaa Naalhi Sports). The age group of this tournament is Under-21.

== Participated Teams ==
=== Group A ===
- Maziya Sports & Recreation Club
- Victory Sports Club
- VB Addu Football Club
- Mahibadhoo Sports Club
- Vyansa

=== Group B ===
- New Radiant Sports Club
- Kelaa Naalhi Sports
- Club Eagles
- Club All Youth Linkage
- Club Valencia

== Group stage ==
Times are Islamabad, Karachi (UTC+5).

=== Group A ===
Team	Pld	W	D	L	GF	GA	GD	Pts
Victory SC	4	2	2	0	13	6	+7	8
Maziya S&RC	4	2	2	0	8	4	+4	8
Vyansa	4	2	2	0	6	3	+3	8
Mahibadhoo	4	1	0	3	9	7	+2	3
VB Addu FC	4	0	0	4	0	15	−15	0

20 February 2012	Maziya Sports & Recreation Club	2-2	Victory Sports Club	Rasmee Dhandu Stadium, Malé
16:00	Mohamed Thasmeen 46'; Guraish Abdul Razzaq 49'	Report	Anas Mohamed 7'; Hassan Ibrahim 45+3'

22 February 2012	VB Addu F.C.	0-4	Mahibadhoo Sports Club	Rasmee Dhandu Stadium, Malé
16:00		Report	Shuaid Saeed 20'; Abdul Basith 37', 57'; Mohamed Sharih 58'

25 February 2012	Mahibadhoo Sports Club	1-2	Vyansa	Rasmee Dhandu Stadium, Malé
16:00	Abdul Basith 42'	Report	Adam Naufal 5' (o.g.); Abdulla Shaffan 70'

27 February 2012	Maziya Sports & Recreation Club	3-0	VB Addu F.C.	Rasmee Dhandu Stadium, Malé
16:00	Hassan Shifaz 6', 43'; Amdhan Ali 61'	Report

1 March 2012	Victory Sports Club	1-1	Vyansa	Rasmee Dhandu Stadium, Malé
16:00	Hussain Naashid 38' (o.g.)	Report	Ibrahim Suhai 48'

3 March 2012	Maziya Sports & Recreation Club	2-1	Mahibadhoo Sports Club	Rasmee Dhandu Stadium, Malé
16:00	Mohamed Thasmeen 53' (pen.), 76'	Report	Ibrahim Shathir 37'

6 March 2012	VB Addu F.C.	0-2	Vyansa	Rasmee Dhandu Stadium, Malé
16:00		Report	Ahmed Haleem 47'; Abdulla Shaffan 85'

8 March 2012	Victory Sports Club	4-3	Mahibadhoo Sports Club	Rasmee Dhandu Stadium, Malé
20:30	Ahmed Sujau 6'; Mohamed Jilwaz Zahir 24', 89'; Affan Hamza 47'	Report	Ibrahim Nooradhdheen 23'; Gasim Samaam 63'; Hussain Riza 90+4'

11 March 2012	Maziya Sports & Recreation Club	1-1	Vyansa	Rasmee Dhandu Stadium, Malé
16:00	Guraish Abdul Razzaq 66'	Report (in Dhivehi)	Ahmed Thoriq 78'

13 March 2012	Victory Sports Club	6-0	VB Addu F.C.	Rasmee Dhandu Stadium, Malé
16:00	Affan Hamza 2'; Mohamed Jilwaz Zahir 24'; Ahmed Sujau 56'; Ahmed Rasheed 58', 90+4'; Ismail Juhain Zahir 88'	Report

=== Group B ===
Team	Pld	W	D	L	GF	GA	GD	Pts
Club Eagles	4	2	2	0	10	5	+5	8
Club Valencia	4	2	1	1	6	6	0	7
Club AYL	4	1	2	1	5	4	+1	5
Kelaa Naalhi	4	1	1	2	4	7	-3	4
New Radiant SC	4	0	2	2	2	5	−3	2

21 February 2012	New Radiant Sports Club	0-1	Kelaa Naalhi Sports	Rasmee Dhandu Stadium, Malé
16:00		Report	Haris Rasheed 48' (pen.)

23 February 2012	Club Eagles	1-1	Club All Youth Linkage	Rasmee Dhandu Stadium, Malé
16:00	Ansar Ibrahim 57' (pen.)	Report	Ayaaz Ahmed 50'

26 February 2012	Club All Youth Linkage	1-2	Club Valencia	Rasmee Dhandu Stadium, Malé
16:00	Moosa Yamin 66'	Report	Huzam Hameed 25'; Mohamed Farish Ibrahim 82'

28 February 2012	New Radiant Sports Club	2-2	Club Eagles	Rasmee Dhandu Stadium, Malé
16:00	Mohamed Shabeen Adam 4'; Safwan Rameez 75'	Report	Abdulla Shafeeu Hashim 13'; Mahroos Mujuthaba 90+3'

2 March 2012	Kelaa Naalhi Sports	1-3	Club Valencia	Rasmee Dhandu Stadium, Malé
16:00	Ahmed Inad 25'	Report	Mohamed Farish Ibrahim 23', 87'; Mohamed Irufaan 59'

4 March 2012	New Radiant Sports Club	0-2	Club All Youth Linkage	Rasmee Dhandu Stadium, Malé
16:00		Report	Moosa Yamin 27'; Migdhadh Saeed 60'

7 March 2012	Club Eagles	4-1	Club Valencia	Rasmee Dhandu Stadium, Malé
16:00	Ahmed Imaaz 3', 6', 58' (pen.); Husain Athif 33'	Report	Mohamed Farish Ibrahim 37' (pen.)

9 March 2012	Kelaa Naalhi Sports	1-1	Club All Youth Linkage	Rasmee Dhandu Stadium, Malé
16:00	Hussain Nihaan 25' (pen.)	Report	Moosa Yamin 12' (pen.)

12 March 2012	New Radiant Sports Club	0-0	Club Valencia	Rasmee Dhandu Stadium, Malé
16:00		Report

14 March 2012	Kelaa Naalhi Sports	1-3	Club Eagles	Rasmee Dhandu Stadium, Malé
16:00	Ahmed Inad 52'	Report	Hussain Athif 2'; Ahmed Imaaz 62'; Hussain Sajid 79' (o.g.)

== Semi final ==
1st Semi winners will be the first team to play the final. 2nd Semi winners will have to play in the 3rd Semi with the 1st Semi losers. The winner of 3rd Semi will be the second team to play in the final.

17 March 2012 1st Semi	Victory Sports Club	1–2	Club Eagles	Rasmee Dhandu Stadium, Malé
16:00	Rilwan Waheed 79' (pen.)	Report	Ansar Ibrahim 46'; Mohamed Zaidh 65' (pen.)

18 March 2012 2nd Semi	Maziya Sports & Recreation Club	3–1	Club Valencia	Rasmee Dhandu Stadium, Malé
16:00	Mohamed Thasmeen 32', 79'; Guraish Abdul Razzaq 35'	Report	Mohamed Farish Ibrahim 70' (pen.)

22 March 2012 3rd semi	Victory Sports Club	2–2 (4–2* p)	Maziya Sports & Recreation Club	Rasmee Dhandu Stadium, Malé
16:00	Ahmed Sujau 48', 90+1'	Report	Guraish Abdul Razzaq 31'; Mohamed Thasmeen 61'
Note: *Rilwan Waheed, Ahmed Ziaan Mohamed, Ahmed Rasheed and Ahmed Sujau scored for Victory in penalties. Hassan Wisaal and Ahmed Shukoor scored for Maziya in penalties.

== Final ==
25 March 2012	Club Eagles	2-3	Victory Sports Club	Rasmee Dhandu Stadium, Malé
20:30	Ahmed Husham 16', 67'	Report	Ahmed Rasheed 24', 87'; Ahmed Ziaan 75'

== Goal scorers ==
6 goals

- (Maziya S&RC) Mohamed Thasmeen

5 goals

- (Club Valencia) Mohamed Farish Ibrahim

4 goals

- (Maziya S&RC) Guraish Abdul Razzaq
- (Victory SC) Ahmed Sujau
- (Victory SC) Ahmed Rasheed
- (Club Eagles) Ahmed Imaaz

3 goals

- (Mahibadhoo) Abdul Basith
- (Club AYL) Moosa Yamin
- (Victory SC) Mohamed Jilwaz Zahir

2 goals

- (Vyansa) Abdulla Shaffan
- (Maziya S&RC) Hassan Shifaz
- (Victory SC) Affan Hamza
- (Club Eagles) Ansar Ibrahim
- (Club Eagles) Hussain Athif
- (Club Eagles) Ahmed Husham
- (Kelaa Naalhi) Ahmed Inad

1 goal

- (Victory SC) Anas Mohamed
- (Victory SC) Hassan Ibrahim
- (Victory SC) Ismail Juhain Zahir
- (Victory SC) Rilwan Waheed
- (Victory SC) Ahmed Ziaan
- (Maziya S&RC) Amdhan Ali
- (Mahibadhoo) Shuaid Saeed
- (Mahibadhoo) Mohamed Sharih
- (Mahibadhoo) Ibrahim Shathir
- (Mahibadhoo) Ibrahim Nooradhdheen
- (Mahibadhoo) Gasim Samaam
- (Mahibadhoo) Hussain Riza
- (Vyansa) Ibrahim Suhail
- (Vyansa) Ahmed Haleem
- (Vyansa) Ahmed Thariq
- (Kelaa Naalhi) Haris Rasheed
- (Kelaa Naalhi) Hussain Nihaan
- (New Radiant SC) Mohamed Shabeen Adam
- (New Radiant SC) Safwan Rameez
- (Club AYL) Ayaaz Ahmed
- (Club AYL) Migdhadh Saeed
- (Club Eagles) Abdulla Shafeeu Hashim
- (Club Eagles) Mahroos Mujuthaba
- (Club Eagles) Mohamed Zaidh
- (Club Valencia) Huzaam Hameed
- (Club Valencia) Mohamed Irufaan

1 own goal

- (Mahibadhoo) Adam Naufal against Vyansa
- (Vyansa) Hussain Naashid against Victory SC
- (Kelaa Naalhi) Hussain Sajid against Club Eagles

== Awards ==
=== Best 4 players ===
- Ahmed Imaaz (Club Eagles)
- Mohamed Thasmeen (Maziya S&RC)
- Hassan Shifaz (Maziya S&RC)
- Mohamed Faseel (Victory SC)

=== Top goal scorer ===
- Mohamed Thasmeen (Maziya S&RC)

=== Best coach ===
- Mohamed Nazeeh (Victory SC)

=== Fair play team ===
- Victory SC
