= 2011 FAM Youth Championship =

FAM Youth Championship
FA Youth Cup
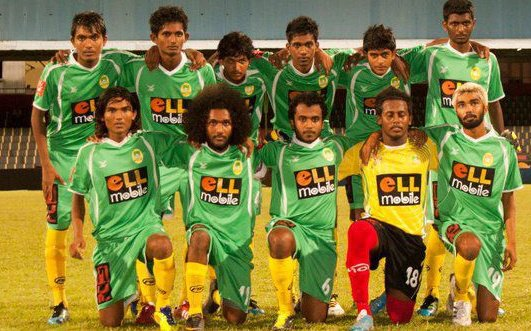
- Maziya S&RC's starting eleven of the 2011 FA Youth Cup

Tournament details
- Country: Maldives
- Teams: 7

Final positions
- Champions: Maziya S&RC (1st title)
- Runners-up: New Radiant SC

Tournament statistics
- Top goal scorer(s): Ali Haisham; Abdul Basith

Statistics of FAM Youth Championship in the 2011 season.

In 2011, The Championship was named as Maldivian FA Youth Cup, for the under-20 players.

== Overview ==
Maziya Sports & Recreation Club won the championship by beating New Radiant SC by 1-0 in the final. Mohamed Shah scored the only goal for them in the first half.

== Teams ==
7 teams participated in the competition, and they were divided into two groups. 4 teams for Group A and 3 teams to Group B.

Group A

- New Radiant Sports Club
- Club Eagles
- Club All Youth Linkage
- Victory Sports Club

Group B

- Club Valencia
- VB Sports Club
- Maziya Sports & Recreation Club

== Group stage ==
=== Group A ===
Team	Pld	W	D	L	GF	GA	GD	Pts
Victory Sports Club	3	2	1	0	8	6	+2	7
New Radiant	3	2	0	1	9	4	+5	6
Club Eagles	3	1	0	2	7	7	0	3
All Youth Linkage	3	0	1	2	4	11	−7	1

8 August 2011	New Radiant	2–1	Club Eagles	Rasmee Dhandu Stadium, Malé
22:00 UTC+5	Ahmed Zaid 5'; Mohamed Jilwaz Zahir 70'	Report	32' Ahmed Imaz

10 August 2011	All Youth Linkage	2–2	Victory Sports Club	Rasmee Dhandu Stadium, Malé
22:00 UTC+5	Ali Shaam 32'; Ahmed Azhan 75'	Report	82' Hussain Shifah; 90' n/a

13 August 2011	New Radiant	1–2	Victory Sports Club	Rasmee Dhandu Stadium, Malé
22:00 UTC+5	Samaah Hussain 11'	Report	53' Ibrahim Rasheed; 90' Hussain Shifah

15 August 2011	All Youth Linkage	1–3	Club Eagles	Rasmee Dhandu Stadium, Malé
22:00 UTC+5	Adam Nashwan 88'	Report	11' Ahmed Imaz; 45' Hussain Athif; 90' Shuhaid Saeed

17 August 2011	Club Eagles	3–4	Victory Sports Club	Rasmee Dhandu Stadium, Malé
22:00 UTC+5	Ibrahim Mubeen Ahmed Rasheed 6'; Zaid Shareef 61'; Hussain Latheef 75'	Report	12' Hussain Shifah; 36' Ibrahim Rasheed; 70' Ismail Juhain Zahir; 88' Shamoon Naseer

20 August 2011	New Radiant	6–1	All Youth Linkage	Rasmee Dhandu Stadium, Malé
22:00 UTC+5	Abdul Basith 9', 76'; Ali Haisham 27', 48', 50', 51'	Report	55' (pen.) Ibrahim Shahir

=== Group B ===
Team	Pld	W	D	L	GF	GA	GD	Pts
Maziya S&RC	4	3	1	0	8	4	+4	10
Club Valencia	4	1	1	2	6	7	–1	4
VB Sports Club	4	1	0	3	5	8	–3	3

9 August 2011	Maziya	1–0	VB Sports Club	Rasmee Dhandu Stadium, Malé
22:00 UTC+5	Hassan Shifaz 29'	Report

11 August 2011	Maziya	1–1	Club Valencia	Rasmee Dhandu Stadium, Malé
22:00 UTC+5	Aaiz 90'	Report	66' Abdul Wahid Ibrahim

14 August 2011	VB Sports Club	0–2	Club Valencia	Rasmee Dhandu Stadium, Malé
22:00 UTC+5		Report	40' Ahmed Nasih; 90' Hussain Zuhair

16 August 2011	VB Sports Club	2–3	Maziya	Rasmee Dhandu Stadium, Malé
22:00 UTC+5	Haidhar Akram (?); Fassan Waleed 36'	Report	53' Affan Hamza; 70' (pen.), 82' Mohamed Thasmeen

19 August 2011	Club Valencia	1–3	Maziya	Rasmee Dhandu Stadium, Malé
22:00 UTC+5	Sultan Habeeb (?)	Report	42' Ali Shamin; 77', 85' Affan Hamza

21 August 2011	Club Valencia	2–3	VB Sports Club	Rasmee Dhandu Stadium, Malé
22:00 UTC+5	Ahmed Ibaad (?); Hussain Zahir (?)	Report	(?) Abdulla Shaffan (?) Fassan Waleed

== Play-offs ==
Page playoffs
A1	Victory Sports Club	1
B1	Maziya	2
A2	New Radiant	1(5)
B2	Club Valencia	1(4)

Semifinal
A1	Victory Sports Club	1
A2	New Radiant	2

Final
B1	Maziya	1
A2	New Radiant	0

=== Page play-offs ===
24 August 2011
22:00 UTC+5

Victory Sports Club	1–2	Maziya
Yoosuf Shuaau 22' (pen.)	Report	25' Mohamed Thasmeen; 49' Ali Shamin

Rasmee Dhandu Stadium, Malé

25 August 2011
22:00 UTC+5

New Radiant	1–1	Club Valencia
Abdul Basith (?)	Report	(?) n/a
Penalties
	5–4

Rasmee Dhandu Stadium, Malé

=== Semi-final ===
27 August 2011
22:00 UTC+5

Victory Sports Club	1–2	New Radiant
Ismail Juhain Zahir (45+?)	Report	13' Mohamed Jilwaz Zahir; 77' Abdul Basith

Rasmee Dhandu Stadium, Malé

=== Final ===
29 August 2011
22:00 UTC+5

Maziya	1–0	New Radiant
Mohamed Shan 24'	Report

Rasmee Dhandu Stadium, Malé

== Awards ==
All the awards were given by the Maldivian Football legend Moosa Manik.

=== Best three players ===
- Ali Haisham (New Radiant SC)
- Abdul Wahid Mohamed (Club Valencia)
- Mohamed Thasmeen (Maziya S&RC)

=== Top goal scorer ===
- Ali Haisham (New Radiant SC)
- Abdul Basith (New Radiant SC)

=== Best goal keeper ===
- Ismail Fathih (Maziya S&RC)

=== Best coach ===
- Mohamed Suwaid (Maziya S&RC)

=== Fair play team ===
- Maziya S&RC
