= 2015 President's Cup (Maldives) final =

2015 President's Cup final
- Event: 2015 President's Cup
New Radiant	Maziya
1	3
- Date: 4 October 2015
- Venue: Addu Football Stadium, Addu City
- Referee: Ahmed Ameez

The 2015 President's Cup (Maldives) final was the 65th Final of the Maldives President's Cup.

== Route to the final ==
New Radiant
Round
Maziya
Opponent
Result
Group stage
Opponent
Result
BG Sports
3–1
Match 1
Valencia
2–0
TC Sports
0–1
Match 2
Victory
2–0
Mahibadhoo
4–2
Match 3
Eagles
1–1
Group A winner

Pos	Team	Pld	Pts
1	New Radiant	3	6
2	TC Sports	3	6
3	BG Sports	3	6
4	Mahibadhoo	3	0

Final standings
Group B winner

Pos	Team	Pld	Pts
1	Maziya	3	7
2	Eagles	3	5
3	Valencia	3	3
4	Victory	3	1

Opponent
Result
Knockout stage
Opponent
Result
Eagles
2–1
Semi-finals
TC Sports
0–0 (a.e.t.) (4 – 2 p)

== Match ==
=== Details ===
4 October
16:00

New Radiant	1–3	Maziya S&RC
Fasir 24'	Report	7' Asadhilla; 39' Umair; 66' Pablo

Addu Football Stadium, Addu City
Referee: Ahmed Ameez (Maldives)

New Radiant	Maziya

== See also ==
- 2015 President's Cup (Maldives)
