= 2012 Third Division Football Tournament =

Third Division
- Season: 2012
- Dates: 15 October 2012 – 4 December 2012
- Champions: Mahibadhoo SC
- Promoted: Mahibadhoo SC; Club Green Streets
- Matches: 59
- Goals: 350 (5.93 per match)

Statistics of Third Division Football Tournament in the 2012 season. According to the FAM Calendar 2012, Third Division Football Tournament will start on 15 October.

== Teams ==
43 teams are competition in the 2012 Third Division Football Tournament, and these teams were divided into 14 groups.

Group 1

- Kelaa Naalhi Sports
- Zeal Sports Club
- Vaikaradhoo Football Club

Group 2

- MS Helping Hand Sports
- L.Q. Sports Club
- Kodey Sports Club

Group 3

- Sports Club Henveyru Dhekunu
- Society for Alifushi Youth
- Club Green Streets

Group 4

- Our Recreation Club
- Club New Oceans
- Rakeedhoo Ijuthimaaee Gulhun

Group 5

- Sealand
- Kudahuvadhoo Sports Club
- Teenage Juniors

Group 6

- Kuda Henveiru United
- Tent Sports Club
- Buru Sports Club

Group 7

- Club Amigos
- Club PK
- S.T.E.L.C.O. Recreation Club

Group 8

- Hilaaly New Generation
- Ilhaar
- The Bows Sports Club

Group 9

- West Sports Club
- Falcon Sports Club
- Youth Revolution Club

Group 10

- Fiyoree Sports Club
- Offu Football Club
- Club O1O

Group 11

- Maaenboodhoo Zuvaanunge Jamiyyaa
- TC Sports Club
- Mahibadhoo Sports Club

Group 12

- Iramaa Youth Association
- Sports Club Velloxia
- Veyliant Sports Club

Group 13

- Lorenzo Sports Club
- Veyru Sports Club
- Sent Sports Club

Group 14

- Naivaadhoo Trainers Sports Club
- Lagoons Sports Club
- Sports Club Rivalsa
- Muiveyo Friends Club

== Group stage ==
=== Group 1 ===
Pos	Team	Pld	W	D	L	GF	GA	GD	Pts	Qualification
1	Kelaa Naalhi Sports	2	2	0	0	6	1	+5	6	Second round
2	Zeal Sports Club	2	1	0	1	6	6	0	3	
3	Vaikaradhoo Football Club	2	0	0	2	5	10	-5	0	

=== Group 2 ===
Pos	Team	Pld	W	D	L	GF	GA	GD	Pts	Qualification
1	L.Q. Sports Club	2	2	0	0	18	7	+11	6	Second round
2	MS Helping Hand	2	1	0	1	13	5	+8	3	
3	Kodey Sports Club	2	0	0	2	5	24	-19	0	

=== Group 3 ===
Pos	Team	Pld	W	D	L	GF	GA	GD	Pts	Qualification
1	Club Green Streets	2	2	0	0	8	0	+8	6	Second round
2	Society for Alifushi Youth	2	1	0	1	7	3	+4	3	
3	SC Henveyru Dhekunu	2	0	0	2	1	13	-12	0	

=== Group 4 ===
Pos	Team	Pld	W	D	L	GF	GA	GD	Pts	Qualification
1	Club New Oceans	2	1	1	0	8	3	+5	4	Second round
2	Our Recreation Club	2	1	1	0	4	2	+2	4	Second round
3	Rakeedhoo I.G.	2	0	0	2	1	8	-7	0	

=== Group 5 ===
Pos	Team	Pld	W	D	L	GF	GA	GD	Pts	Qualification
1	Kudahuvadhoo Sports Club	2	1	1	0	1	0	+1	4	Second round
2	Teenage Juniors	2	1	0	1	11	3	+8	3	
3	Sealand	2	0	1	1	2	11	-9	1	

=== Group 6 ===
Pos	Team	Pld	W	D	L	GF	GA	GD	Pts	Qualification
1	Tent Sports Club	2	1	1	0	4	3	+1	4	Second round
2	Kuda Henveiru United	2	0	2	0	4	4	0	2	
3	Buru Sports Club	2	0	1	1	1	2	-1	1	

=== Group 7 ===
Pos	Team	Pld	W	D	L	GF	GA	GD	Pts	Qualification
1	Club PK	2	2	0	0	13	0	+13	6	Second round
2	S.T.E.L.C.O. RC	2	1	0	1	13	6	+7	3	
3	Club Amigos	2	0	0	2	4	24	-20	0	

=== Group 8 ===
Pos	Team	Pld	W	D	L	GF	GA	GD	Pts	Qualification
1	Hilaaly New Generation	2	2	0	0	7	2	+5	6	Second round
2	The Bows Sports Club	2	1	0	1	12	5	+7	3	
3	Ilhaar	2	0	0	2	1	13	-12	0	

=== Group 9 ===
Pos	Team	Pld	W	D	L	GF	GA	GD	Pts	Qualification
1	Youth Revolution Club	2	2	0	0	14	0	+14	6	Second round
2	West Sports Club	2	1	0	1	2	5	-3	3	
3	Falcon Sports Club	2	0	0	2	0	11	-11	0	

=== Group 10 ===
Pos	Team	Pld	W	D	L	GF	GA	GD	Pts	Qualification
1	Fiyoree Sports Club	2	2	0	0	12	2	+10	6	Second round
2	Club O1O	2	1	0	1	3	3	0	3	
3	Offu Football Club	2	0	0	2	3	13	-10	0	

=== Group 11 ===
Pos	Team	Pld	W	D	L	GF	GA	GD	Pts	Qualification
1	Mahibadhoo SC	2	2	0	0	12	2	+10	6	Second round
2	Maaenboodhoo ZJ	2	0	1	1	5	10	-5	1	
3	TC Sports Club	2	0	1	1	3	8	-5	1	

=== Group 12 ===
Pos	Team	Pld	W	D	L	GF	GA	GD	Pts	Qualification
1	Sports Club Velloxia	2	1	1	0	3	1	+2	4	Second round
2	Veyliant Sports Club	2	1	1	0	3	2	+1	4	
3	Iramaa Youth Association	2	0	0	2	1	4	-3	0	

=== Group 13 ===
Pos	Team	Pld	W	D	L	GF	GA	GD	Pts	Qualification
1	Sent Sports Club	2	1	1	0	7	3	+4	4	Second round
2	Lorenzo Sports Club	2	0	2	0	4	4	0	2	
3	Veyru Sports Club	2	0	1	1	3	7	-4	1	

=== Group 14 ===
Pos	Team	Pld	W	D	L	GF	GA	GD	Pts	Qualification
1	Muiveyo Friends Club	3	3	0	0	12	4	+8	9	Quarter-finals
2	Naivaadhoo Trainers SC	3	2	0	1	29	4	+25	6	
3	Lagoons Sports Club	3	1	0	2	14	9	+5	3	
4	Sports Club Rivalsa	2	0	0	3	4	42	-38	0	

==== Ranking of second-placed teams ====
Pos	Grp	Team	Pld	W	D	L	GF	GA	GD	Pts	Qualification
1	4	Our Recreation Club	2	1	1	0	4	2	+2	4	Second round
2	12	Veyliant Sports Club	2	1	1	0	3	2	+1	4	
3	2	MS Helping Hand	2	1	0	1	13	5	+8	3	
4	5	Teenage Juniors	2	1	0	1	11	3	+8	3	
5	7	S.T.E.L.C.O. RC	2	1	0	1	13	6	+7	3	
6	8	The Bows Sports Club	2	1	0	1	12	5	+7	3	
7	3	Society for Alifushi Youth	2	1	0	1	7	3	+4	3	
8	1	Zeal Sports Club	2	1	0	1	6	6	0	3	
9	10	Club O1O	2	1	0	1	3	3	0	3	
10	9	West Sports Club	2	1	0	1	2	5	-3	3	
11	6	Kuda Henveiru United	2	0	2	0	4	4	0	2	
12	13	Lorenzo Sports Club	2	0	2	0	4	4	0	2	
13	11	Maaenboodhoo ZJ	2	0	1	1	5	10	-5	1	

== Second round ==
21 November 2012	Kelaa Naalhi Sports	5–1	L.Q. Sports Club	Turf pitch 1, Malé
15:45	Ahmed Waheed 17', 90+1'; Adam Nifaaz 54'; Hussain Zahir 64'; Ali Imadh 82'		75' Hassan Naseer

21 November 2012	Club Green Streets	6–0	Club New Oceans	Henveiru Ground, Malé
15:45	Minan Rasheed 2'; Adam Inaz 48', 90+3'; Aslam Raha 57' (pen.), 81' (pen.); Ali Riswan Ahmed 84'

22 November 2012	Our Recreation Club	8–1	Kudahuvadhoo Sports Club	Turf pitch 1, Malé
15:45	Ali Shamoon Hamdhulla 9', 79'; Usairam Mohamed 13'; Ismail Fazeel 53', 55'; Hamid Rasheed 67'; Mohamed Naushad 88'; Mohamed Munaaz 90+1'		69' Mohamed Ismail

22 November 2012	Tent Sports Club	0–3	Club PK	Henveiru Ground, Malé
15:45			26' Mohamed Ashraf; 56' Ibrahim Atheeq Hassan; 70' Noor Ibrahim

23 November 2012	Hilaaly New Generation	2–2 (3–5 p)	Youth Revolution Club	Turf pitch 1, Malé
15:45	Mohamed Nasheed 85', 89'		36' Hussain Nashid; 48' Mohamed Jinaah
	Penalties
	Ali Mohamed (penalty scored) n/a (penalty missed); Abdulla Shaffan (penalty scored); Ali Shaihan (penalty scored)		(penalty scored) Ahmed Haleem; (penalty scored) Ahmed Jinaah; (penalty scored) Hussain Nashid; (penalty scored) Ismail Nashid; (penalty scored) Ahmed Rasheed

24 November 2012	Fiyoree Sports Club	2–4	Mahibadhoo SC	Turf pitch 1, Malé
15:45	Asim Habeeb 58'; Ali Shafeeu 70' (o.g.)		25', 60' Ali Shaalim; 57' Mohamed Naushad; 68' Ahmed Nuhaadh

24 November 2012	Sports Club Velloxia	1–3	Sent Sports Club	Henveiru Ground, Malé
15:45	Ali Abdulla 78'		26', 87' Hussain Ahusan; 59' Ismail Zihan

== Quarter-finals ==
26 November 2012
15:45

Kelaa Naalhi Sports	1–3	Club Green Streets
Ahmed Waheed 53'	Report	2' Mohamed Nail; 4' Adam Inaz; 76' (pen.) Aslam Raha

Turf pitch 1, Malé

26 November 2012
15:45

Our Recreation Club	2–1	Club PK
Ahmed Haam 54' (o.g.); Abdul Azeez Abdulla 85'	Report	17' Noor Ibrahim

Henveiru Ground, Malé

27 November 2012
15:45

Youth Revolution Club	1–2	Mahibadhoo SC
Ahmed Haleem 78'	Report	36', 65' Ahmed Imran

Turf pitch 1, Malé

27 November 2012
15:45

Sent Sports Club	2–1	Muiveyo Friends Club
Ahmed Shuoon 17'; Mohamed Najih 60'	Report	65' Hassan Thaufeeq

Henveiru Ground, Malé

== Semi-finals ==
30 November 2012
15:45

Club Green Streets	1–0	Our Recreation Club
Adam Inaz 59'

Turf pitch 1, Malé

30 November 2012
15:45

Mahibadhoo SC	1–1	Sent Sports Club
Ali Shaalim 75'		57' Mohamed Naajih
Penalties
Gasim Samaam (penalty scored); Ahmed Riffath (penalty scored); Mohamed Naushad (penalty scored) n/a (penalty missed); Ibrahim Zalif (penalty scored); Ali Risham (penalty scored); Ahmed Nuhaadh (penalty scored)	6–5	(penalty missed) n/a (penalty scored) Ibrahim Shamil; (penalty scored) Hussain Niyaaf; (penalty scored) Mus'ab Mohamed; (penalty scored) Ahmed Rishuny; (penalty scored) Sharuvaan Ahmed; (penalty missed) n/a

Henveiru Ground, Malé

== Final ==
4 December 2012
15:45

Club Green Streets	3–4	Mahibadhoo SC
Ali Riswan Ahmed 2'; Mohamed Nail 12'; Mohamed Aflaz Rasheed 73'	Report	34' Mohamed Naushad; 40' Adam Mauroof; 45+2' Ahmed Imran; 52' Ali Ayaz

Turf pitch 1, Malé

== Awards ==
Award	Winner
Best player	Mohamed Nail (Club Green Streets)
Fair-play team	Sent Sports Club
