= Mansa Sylla =

Guinean footballer

Personal information
- Date of birth: 22 August 1983 (age 43)
- Place of birth: Guinea
- Position: Defender

Senior career*
Years	Team	Apps	(Gls)
2008	Sarawak FA		
2008–?	Viva Kerala		
2011	Magwe F.C.		
2012	Manaw Myay F.C.		
2013	New Radiant		
2014	Magwe F.C.		
2015	Dhaka Mohammedan		
2016	Uttar Baridhara SC		
- * Club domestic league appearances and goals

Mansa Sylla (born 22 August 1983) is a Guinean footballer who played as a defender.

== Career ==
=== Sarawak FA ===
Brought in by Sarawak FA of the Malaysia Super League for the 2008 season, Sylla made intermittent appearances during his spell there due to constantly getting yellow and red cards. As a result, his contract was cancelled early by the club.

=== New Radiant ===
Joining of New Radiant of the Maldivian Dhivehi Premier League in January 2013, the Guinean defender put in a series of strong showings for the club in all competitions, including scoring the winner in the 2013 Maldives FA Cup Final. Eventually, he was released along with Ghanaian Yusif Aberdeen and Nigerian Kingsley.
