= 2016 President's Cup (Maldives) final =

2016 President's Cup final
- Event: 2016 President's Cup
Eagles	TC Sports
1	0
- After extra time
- Date: 29 November 2016
- Venue: National Football Stadium, Malé
- Referee: Zaeem Ali

The 2016 President's Cup (Maldives) final was the 66th Final of the Maldives President's Cup.

== Route to the final ==
Eagles
Round
TC Sports
Opponent
Result
Group stage
Opponent
Result
New Radiant
3–0
Match 1
Eagles
1–2
TC Sports
2–1
Match 2
New Radiant
4–0
Group 1 winner

Pos	Team	Pld	Pts
1	Eagles	2	6
2	TC Sports	2	3
3	New Radiant	2	0

Final standings
Group 1 runner-up

Pos	Team	Pld	Pts
1	Eagles	2	6
2	TC Sports	2	3
3	New Radiant	2	0

Opponent
Result
Knockout stage
Opponent
Result
United Victory
3–2
Semi-finals
Maziya
2–0

== Match ==
=== Details ===
29 November
15:50

Eagles	1 – 0 (a.e.t.)	TC Sports
Rizuvan 91'	Report

National Football Stadium, Male'
Referee: Zaeem Ali

Eagles	TC Sports

== See also ==
- 2016 President's Cup (Maldives)
