= 2012 H.E. Mahinda Rajapaksa Under-23 International Football Trophy Final =

2012 Rajapaksa U-23 International Trophy Final
- Event: 2012 H.E. Mahinda Rajapaksa Under-23 International Football Trophy
Pakistan U23	Maldives U23
(Pakistan)	(Maldives)
1	2
- Date: 9 December 2012
- Venue: Jayathilake Sports Complex, Nawalapitiya

The 2012 H.E. Mahinda Rajapaksa Under-23 International Football Trophy Final was a football match at the Jayathilake Sports Complex, Nawalapitiya on 9 December 2012, to determine the winner of the 2012 H.E. Mahinda Rajapaksa Under-23 International Football Trophy. It was the first H.E. Mahinda Rajapaksa Under-23 International Football Trophy final. The match was contested by the Maldives and Pakistan.

Maldives won the match 2–1 after 90 minutes; Maldives opened the scoring through Rilwan Waheed's free kick just after half-time, before Assadhulla Abdulla doubled the lead with a long through ball from Rilwan. Pakistan's goal was an own goal which was deflected by Moosa Yaamin after a shot by Saed Ahmed.

== Route to the final ==
Key to colours in group tables
Top two placed teams advance to the finals

Team	Pld	W	D	L	GF	GA	GD	Pts
Maldives	3	2	0	1	4	1	+3	6
Pakistan	3	1	1	1	1	1	0	4
Sri Lanka	3	1	1	1	1	3	−2	4
Bangladesh	3	1	0	2	1	2	−1	3

== Match ==
=== Details ===
9 December 2012
15:30

Maldives	2 – 1	Pakistan
Rilwan 57'; Assadhulla 61'	Report	84' (o.g.) Yaamin

Maldives	Pakistan

== See also ==
- 2012 H.E. Mahinda Rajapaksa Under-23 International Football Trophy
