= 2016 FAM Youth Championship =

FAM Youth Championship
Tournament details
- Country: Maldives
- Venues: 2
- Dates: 19 August – 23 October
- Teams: 8

Final positions
- Champions: Eagles (2nd title)
- Runners-up: TC Sports

Tournament statistics
- Matches played: 32
- Goals scored: 105 (3.28 per match)

The 2016 FAM Youth Championship was the 5th season of the FAM Youth Championship.

== Teams ==
Under-21 teams of the 8 clubs in 2016 Dhivehi Premier League will be contesting in the championship.

== Format ==
Eight teams competing will be engaged in a round-robin tournament, each team plays once against the others. Three points are awarded for a win, one for a draw and zero for a loss. The teams are ranked in the league table by points gained, then goal difference, then goals scored and then their head-to-head record. The top 4 teams will be qualified for the Play-offs.

Page playoff system was used in this edition. The first and second place teams play each other, with the winner advancing directly to the final. The winner of the other page playoff game between the third and fourth place teams plays the loser of the first/second playoff game in the semi-final. The winner of the semi-final moves on to the final.

== League table ==
Pos	Club	P	W	D	L	GF	GA	GD	Pts	Qualification
1	TC Sports Club U21s	7	5	2	0	18	4	+14	17	Play-offs
2	Club Eagles U21s	7	4	1	2	17	11	+6	13	Play-offs
3	Maziya U21s	7	4	0	3	12	6	+6	12	Play-offs
4	Club Valencia U21s	7	3	1	3	7	7	0	10	Play-offs
5	Victory Sports Club U21s	7	3	1	3	10	15	−5	10	
6	New Radiant U21s	7	2	3	2	11	15	−4	9	
7	BG Sports Club U21s	7	1	1	5	7	16	−9	4	
8	United Victory U21s	7	0	3	4	8	16	−8	3	

== Play-offs ==
Page playoffs
1	TC Sports Club U21s	1(4)
2	Club Eagles U21s	1(5)
3	Maziya U21s	1
4	Club Valencia U21s	0

Semifinal
1	TC Sports Club U21s	3
3	Maziya U21s	1

Final
2	Club Eagles U21s	5
1	TC Sports Club U21s	3

=== Page play-offs ===
15 October 2016
15:50

TC Sports Club U21s	1–1	Club Eagles U21s
Aiman Thaufeeq 88'	Report	36' Hamdhaan Abdul Sattar
Penalties
Ibrahim Waheed Hassan (penalty scored); Mohamed Arash Assad (penalty scored); Hussain Jumaan (penalty scored); Aiman Thaufeeq (penalty missed)	4–5	(penalty scored) Shifan Hassan; (penalty scored) Ansar Ibrahim; (penalty scored) Hassan Raif Ahmed; (penalty scored) Aisam Ibrahim; (penalty scored) Ibrahim Hamdhaan

National Football Stadium, Malé

15 October 2016
21:00

Maziya U21s	1–0	Club Valencia U21s
Mohamed Inshal 17'	Report

National Football Stadium, Malé

=== Semi-final ===
19 October 2016
15:50

TC Sports Club U21s	3–1	Maziya U21s
Ibrahim Waheed Hassan 45'; Akmal Mohamed 52'; Ali Haafiz 90'	Report	26' Mohamed Inshal

National Football Stadium, Malé

=== Final ===
16 October 2016
15:50

Club Eagles U21s	5–3	TC Sports Club U21s
Ansar Ibrahim 41', 57'; Ahmed Rizuvan 45+2' (82); Aisam Ibrahim 49'	Report	62', 87' (pen.) Ali Haafiz; 72' Ibrahim Waheed Hassan

National Football Stadium, Malé

== Awards ==
=== Best 4 players ===
- Ansar Ibrahim (Club Eagles)
- Ali Haafiz (TC Sports Club)
- Mohamed Inshal (Maziya)
- Adam Im'aan (Club Eagles)

=== Best coach ===
- Ahmed Shakir (Club Eagles)

=== Fair play team ===
- Maziya
