= Ali Naajih =

Maldivian footballer

Personal information
- Full name: Ali Naajih
- Date of birth: 8 December 1999 (age 26)
- Height: 1.85 m (6 ft 1 in)
- Position: Goalkeeper

Team information
- Current team: New Radiant TKF Sports Club
- Number: 18

Youth career
- 2019: New Radiant
- 2019: United Victory

Senior career*
Years	Team	Apps	(Gls)
2019–2020	United Victory	2	(0)
2020-2021	United Victory	7	(0)
2021–2022	United Victory	4	(0)
2022–	United Victory	7	(0)
2023–	Maziya S&RC (loan)	0	(0)
2025	New Radiant	1	(0)
25-26	United Victory	4	(0)

International career
2019-2021	Maldives U23	4	(0)
2021–	Maldives	3	(0)
- * Club domestic league appearances and goals

Ali Naajih (born 8 December 1999) is a Maldivian professional footballer who plays as a goalkeeper for United Victory.

== Club career ==
Ali Naajih started training with New Radiant youth team in 2019 and after they got suspended, he moved to United Victory and played in FAM Youth Championship with United Victory.

He became a regular starter for United Victory in Dhivehi Premier League after Ihusan Abdhul Ghanee took over.

•On 22 April 2022 against Club Valencia (Maldives) he got the Man of the Match award for his performance; this was the first time a local goalkeeper won the Man of the match in the 2019-2020 season and first one to win it since 3 January 2020.

In 2023, Naajih Joined Maziya S&RC on loan for the 2023 Dhivehi Premier League season and AFC Cup. During his loan spell, Maziya S&RC won the 2023 Dhivehi Premier League title.

In 2025, Naajih Joined New Radiant on a temporary release from United Victory to participate in the Maldives League Cup, Following the conclusion of the tournament, he returned to United Victory and rejoined the squad for the 2025-26 Dhivehi Premier League season.

== International career ==
Naajih was first called up to the Maldives U23 National Football Team in February 2019, for the 220 AFC U-23 Championship qualification tournament held in Saudi Arabia. He was also included in the Maldives U23 National Football Team Squad for the 2019 South Asian Games in Nepal.

He made his international debut for the Maldives U23 National Football Team on 25 October 2021, in a 4–0 defeat against Iraq national under-23 football team During the 2022 AFC U-23 Asian Cup qualification in Bahrain.

Naajih made his debut for the Maldives national football team on 9 November 2021 against Sri Lanka national football team in the 2021 Four Nations Football Tournament, a friendly tournament held in Sri Lanka.

== Career statistics ==
=== Club ===
As of match played February 2022

Appearances and goals by club, season and competition
Club	Season	Division	League		President's Cup	FAM League Cup	Total	
Club	Season	Division	Apps	Goals	Apps		Apps	Goals
United Victory	19-20	Premier League	2	0	—	—	2	0
United Victory	20-21	Premier League	7	0	—	—	7	0
United Victory	21-22	Premier League	0	0	4	—	4	0
United Victory	22-23	Premier League	7	0	—	—	7	0
Maziya S&RC	23-	Premier League	0	0	—	—	0	0
New Radiant S.C.	25-	—	—	—	—	1	1	0
United Victory	25-26	Premier League	4	0	—	—	4	0
	Total		20	0	4	1	25	0
Career totals			20	0	4	1	25	0

== Honours ==
Maziya

● Dhivehi Premier League : 2023
