= 2013 Maldivian Second Division Football Tournament =

Enjoy Championship

Tournament details
- Country: Maldives

Final positions
- Champions: Sports Club Mecano
- Runners-up: Mahibadhoo SC

These are the statistics of Second Division Football Tournament in the 2013 season. The FAM rebranded the name of the "Second Division Football Tournament" to "Enjoy Championship" after the sponsorship from Enjoy juice.

== Teams ==
Nine teams competed in the 2013 Second Division Football Tournament, divided into two groups.

Group 1	Group 2
United Victory; Club Riverside; JJ Sports Club; Mahibadhoo Sports Club; Club Green Streets	Vyansa; Club Gaamagu; Sports Club Mecano; Club Zefrol

== Group stage round ==
From each group, the top two teams advanced to the league round.

=== Group 1 ===
Club Green Streets and Mahibadhoo SC advanced to the league round as the top two teams of the group.

=== Group 2 ===
Club Zefrol and Sports Club Mecano advanced to the league round as the top two teams of the group.

== League round ==
The top two teams from each group qualified to compete in this round. As a total of four teams played in this round of the tournament, the top two teams from this round advanced to the final. The top two teams of this round also played in the playoff for the 2014 Dhivehi League. Mahibadhoo SC and Sports Club Mecano claimed the first and second position to advance to the final.

== Final ==
22 June 2012	Sports Club Mecano	1–1; Penalties 5–4	Mahibadhoo SC	Rasmee Dhandu Stadium, Malé
21:00	Goal	Report	23' Ibrahim Shathir

== Awards ==
Award	Details
Best Player	Mohamed Imran of Sports Club Mecano
Best Goalkeeper	Ali Abdulla of Sports Club Mecano

== Prize money ==
Final placing	Prize money (Maldivian rufiyaa)
Champions	MVR 15,000
Runner-up	MVR 7,000
