= 2019 FAM Youth Championship =

FAM Youth Championship
Tournament details
- Country: Maldives
- Venue: 1
- Dates: 4 – 19 February 2019
- Teams: 9

Final positions
- Champions: Eagles (4th title)
- Runners-up: TC Sports

The 2019 FAM Youth Championship was the 8th season of the FAM Youth Championship.

== Teams ==
9 teams participated in this year's Youth Championship. New Radiant prepared for the championship but they were unable to take part since they were suspended from all football activities due to financial reasons. On 30 January 2019, United Victory participated in the championship with New Radiant U21 players.

=== Personnel ===
Note: Flags indicate national team as has been defined under FIFA eligibility rules. Players may hold more than one non-FIFA nationality.

Team	Head coach	Captain
Club Eagles U21s	(Maldives) Hassan Raif Ahmed	(Maldives) Ahmed Nimad
Club Eydhafushi U21s	(Maldives) Unais Zubair	(Maldives) Afiu Mohamed Hamid
Club Green Streets U21s	(Maldives) Abdulla Yaameen	(Maldives) Ashraf Luthfy
Da Grande U21s	(Maldives) Zaidhaan Ahmed	(Maldives) Ahmed Nashid
Foakaidhoo U21s	(Maldives) Mohamed Jailam	(Maldives) Hamdhulla Fernando
Maziya U21s	(Maldives) Hussain Shareef	(Maldives) Ahmed Suzayr
TC Sports Club U21s	(Maldives) Mohamed Arash Assad	(Maldives) Yoosuf Azeem
United Victory U21s	(Maldives) Yusuf Jaisham Nafiz	(Maldives) Muaviyath Ilham
Victory U21s	(Maldives) Maahy Abdulla	(Maldives) Fareed Mohamed

== Group stage ==
From each group, the top two teams will be advanced for the Semi-finals.

All times listed are Maldives Standard Time. UTC+05:00

Key to colors in group tables
Teams that advance to the semi-finals: Group winners; Group runners-up

=== Group A ===
Team	Pld	W	D	L	GF	GA	GD	Pts
TC Sports Club U21s	3	2	1	0	8	4	+4	7
Da Grande U21s	3	1	1	1	3	4	−1	4
Victory U21s	3	0	3	0	1	1	0	3
Foakaidhoo U21s	3	0	1	2	2	5	−3	1

4 February 2019	TC Sports Club U21s	3–2	Foakaidhoo U21s	National Football Stadium, Malé
16:00	Nisham Mohamed Rasheed (yellow card) 45+1' (yellow-red card) 81'; Azzam Abdulla 55' (pen.) (penalty missed) 80'; Mohamed Juman Ahmed 57', 86'	Report	3', 45+2' (pen.) (yellow card) 79' Hassan Nazeem; (red card) 18' Abdussadaad Adam	Referee: Adam Fazeel (Maldives)

4 February 2019	Victory U21s	0–0	Da Grande U21s	National Football Stadium, Malé
20:30	Hussain Naafiu (yellow card) 90+4'	Report	(penalty missed) 90+5' Mohamed Sayam Saeed	Referee: Ahmed Aslam (Maldives)

6 February 2019	Foakaidhoo U21s	0–2	Da Grande U21s	National Football Stadium, Malé
16:00		Report	11', 90+3' Ahmed Husaam; (yellow card) 90+2' Yoosuf Sidhaam Ali	Referee: Jaufar Rasheed (Maldives)

6 February 2019	TC Sports Club U21s	1–1	Victory U21s	National Football Stadium, Malé
20:30	Akmal Mohamed 22'; Mohamed Zayan Ahmed (yellow card) 75'	Report	(yellow card) 52' Mohamed Shaaheen Basheer; 64' Ahmed Zawl Nazim	Referee: Ahmed Afsah (Maldives)

8 February 2019	TC Sports Club U21s	4–1	Da Grande U21s	National Football Stadium, Malé
20:30	Zayan Naseer 19'; Akmal Mohamed 27', 37', 54'	Report	45+2' Aiman Thaufeeq	Referee: Hussain Sinan (Maldives)

10 February 2019	Foakaidhoo U21s	0–0	Victory U21s	National Football Stadium, Malé
20:30				Referee: Jaufar Rasheed (Maldives)

=== Group B ===
Team	Pld	W	D	L	GF	GA	GD	Pts
Club Eagles U21s	4	4	0	0	11	2	+9	12
Club Green Streets U21s	4	2	0	2	7	4	+3	6
Club Eydhafushi U21s	4	2	0	2	5	8	−3	6
Maziya U21s	4	1	0	3	2	4	−2	3
United Victory U21s	4	1	0	3	3	10	−7	3

5 February 2019	Maziya U21s	1–0	Club Green Streets U21s	National Football Stadium, Malé
16:00	Mohamed Sahil (yellow card) 21'; Ibrahim Imraah 32'; Mohammmadh Shazaan (yellow card) 82'	Report		Referee: Hussain Sinan (Maldives)

5 February 2019	Club Eydhafushi U21s	1–3	Club Eagles U21s	National Football Stadium, Malé
20:30	Ahmed Aiham 15' (red card) 70'	Report	23' Hussain Ahusam Moosa; 65' Ismail Vifaaq; (yellow card) 83' Haisham Hassan; 88' Hassan Raif Ahmed	Referee: Abdulla Shathir (Maldives)

7 February 2019	Maziya U21s	1–2	United Victory U21s	National Football Stadium, Malé
16:00	Yaamin Ali 90+2'	Report	31' Ahmed Haamy Najaah; 83' Yusuf Jaisham Nafiz	Referee: Abdulla Shathir (Maldives)

7 February 2019	Club Green Streets U21s	4–1	Club Eydhafushi U21s	National Football Stadium, Malé
20:30	Hussain Shareef 20' (o.g.); Ahmed Bassam Mohamed Naeem 53'; Abdulla Yaameen 55'; Ahmed Tholal 77'	Report	72' Muhammadh Abaan Ali; (yellow card) 90' Aimaan Habeeb	Referee: Zaeem Ali (Maldives)

9 February 2019	Maziya U21s	0–1	Club Eydhafushi U21s	National Football Stadium, Malé
16:00	Mohamed Azhan Hamid (yellow card) 68'; Ashfaq Ahmed (yellow card) 70'	Report	35' Ismail Shareef	Referee: Ahmed Abdulla (Maldives)

9 February 2019	Club Eagles U21s	5–0	United Victory U21s	National Football Stadium, Malé
20:30	Hassan Raif Ahmed 1', 13', 51' (yellow card) 55'; Mohamed Azumoon 17', 54'; Hussain Affash (yellow card) 29'	Report	(yellow card) 47' Ahmed Haamy Najaah	Referee: Adam Fazeel (Maldives)

11 February 2019	Club Green Streets U21s	2–0	United Victory U21s	National Football Stadium, Malé
16:00	Hussain Aik (yellow card) 32'; Abdulla Yaameen 53', 90' (pen.)	Report	(yellow card) 89' Afuzal Waheed	Referee: Zaeem Ali (Maldives)

11 February 2019	Maziya U21s	0–1	Club Eagles U21s	National Football Stadium, Malé
20:30		Report	74' Mohamed Azumoon	Referee: Ahmed Aslam (Maldives)

13 February 2019	Club Green Streets U21s	1–2	Club Eagles U21s	National Football Stadium, Malé
16:00	Abdulla Yaameen 45+2'	Report	15' Musannif Mohamed; (yellow card) 45+1' Hussain Ahusam Moosa; 87' Adam Fahumaan	Referee: Hussain Sinan (Maldives)

13 February 2019	Club Eydhafushi U21s	2–1	United Victory U21s	National Football Stadium, Malé
20:30	Hussain Hanaan 29'; Ismail Shareef 30'; Ali Naseem (yellow card) 53'	Report	(yellow card) 17' Hussain Shafee; (yellow card) 45+1' Ali Azumee; (yellow card) 77' Hassan Rasheed; 85' Yooh Naseer	Referee: Adam Fazeel (Maldives)

== Knockout phase ==
The semi-finals were scheduled to play on 15 February and the final on 18 February 2020. Due to a cricket series – India-Maldives Friendship Cricket Series, organized by Ministry of Youth, Sports, and Community Empowerment, Cricket Board of Maldives and India Embassy in Maldives, scheduled to start on 15 February, in which Cabinet of the Maldives participates, Football Association of Maldives announced that the semi-finals will be played on 16 February and the final match will be played on 19 February 2019.

=== Bracket ===
Semi-finals
16 February - 16:00
TC Sports Club U21s	2
Club Green Streets U21s	1
16 February - 20:30
Club Eagles U21s	3
Da Grande U21s	1

Final
19 February - 20:30
TC Sports Club U21s	0
Club Eagles U21s	1

=== Semi-finals ===
16 February 2019
16:00

TC Sports Club U21s	2–1	Club Green Streets U21s
Zayan Naseer 4', 10'; Mohamed Yazdhan Hussain (yellow card) 42'; Ahmed Raslaan Hameed (yellow card) 64'; Afraah Mohamed (yellow card) 83'	Report	49' (yellow card) 52' Hassan Lawh; (yellow card) 54' Mohamed Hazim Rifath

National Football Stadium, Malé
Referee: Abdulla Shathir (Maldives)

16 February 2019
20:30

Club Eagles U21s	3–1	Da Grande U21s
Hassan Aleef Ibrahim (yellow card) 2' (yellow-red card) 69'; Mohamed Azumoon 45+2'; Hassan Raif Ahmed 47', 90+3' (pen.)	Report	(yellow card) 47' Ahnaf Rasheed; (yellow card) 90+5' Ahmed Zidhan; 90+7' Saim Mohamed

National Football Stadium, Malé
Referee: Ahmed Afsah (Maldives)

=== Final ===
19 February 2019
20:30

TC Sports Club U21s	0–1	Club Eagles U21s
Zayan Naseer (yellow card) 43'; Mohamed Yazdhan Hussain (yellow card) 57'	Report	33' Mohamed Azumoon; (yellow card) 90' Hassan Raif Ahmed

National Football Stadium, Malé
Referee: Abdulla Shathir (Maldives)

== Awards ==
=== Best 3 players ===
- Hassan Raif Ahmed (Club Eagles U21s)
- Shaifulla Ibrahim (Club Eagles U21s)
- Abdulla Yaameen (Club Green Streets U21s)

=== Best goalkeeper ===
- Maahy Abdulla (Victory U21s)

=== Fair play team ===
- Victory U21s
