= Moosa Manik =

Maldivian footballer (born 1963)

Personal information
- Date of birth: 29 December 1963 (age 62)
- Place of birth: Malé, Maldives
- Height: 1.78 m (5 ft 10 in)
- Positions: Forward; midfielder

Senior career*
Years	Team	Apps	(Gls)
1980–1992	New Radiant SC		
1993–1996	Club Valencia		
1997–1999	Hurriyya SC		
2000–2001	New Radiant SC		

International career
1984–1999	Maldives		
- * Club domestic league appearances and goals

Moosa Manik (born 29 December 1963), known as Kuda Moosa, is a Maldivian football coach and a former player.
