= 2012 H.E. Mahinda Rajapaksa Under-23 International Football Trophy =

Tournament details
- Host country: Sri Lanka
- Dates: 3 – 9 December
- Teams: 4
- Venue: 1 (in 1 host city)

Final positions
- Champions: Maldives (1st title)
- Runners-up: Pakistan

Tournament statistics
- Matches played: 7
- Goals scored: 11 (1.57 per match)
- Top scorer(s): (Maldives) Hassan Adhuham (Maldives) Assadhulla Abdulla (2 goals each)

The 2012 H.E. Mahinda Rajapaksa Under-23 International Football Trophy was the first edition of the tournament which took place in Sri Lanka from 3–9 December 2012.

The tournament was won by Maldives, who defeated Pakistan 2–1 in the final.

== Hosts ==
Sri Lanka were the hosts of the tournament as this is organised by the Ministry of Sports in association with the Football Federation of Sri Lanka.

== Venue ==
Nawalapitiya
Jayathilake Sports Complex
Capacity: 20,000

== Participated nations ==
- Sri Lanka – Host
- Pakistan
- Bangladesh
- Maldives

== Group stage ==
All times are Sri Lanka Time (SLST) – UTC+05:30

Key to colours in group tables
Top two placed teams advance to the finals

Team	Pld	W	D	L	GF	GA	GD	Pts
Maldives	3	2	0	1	4	1	+3	6
Pakistan	3	1	1	1	1	1	0	4
Sri Lanka	3	1	1	1	1	3	−2	4
Bangladesh	3	1	0	2	1	2	−1	3

3 December 2012
14:00

Sri Lanka	0 – 3	Maldives
	Report	Assadhulla; Adhuham pen.'

3 December 2012
16:00

Bangladesh	0 – 1	Pakistan
		80' Saeed

5 December 2012
13:30

Pakistan	0 – 1	Maldives
	Report	Imaaz

5 December 2012
15:30

Sri Lanka	1 – 0	Bangladesh
Prasad 71'	Report

7 December 2012
13:30

Maldives	0 – 1	Bangladesh
	Report	31' Touhidul Alam

7 December 2012
15:30

Sri Lanka	0 – 0	Pakistan

== Final ==
9 December 2012
15:30

Maldives	2 – 1	Pakistan
Rilwan 57'; Assadhulla 61'	Report	84' (o.g.) Yaamin

== Winner ==
2012 Mahinda Rajapaksa Under-23 International Football Trophy

Maldives
First title

== Goalscorers ==
2 goals

- (Maldives) Hassan Adhuham
- (Maldives) Assadhulla Abdulla

1 goal

- (Pakistan) Saeed Ahmed
- (Maldives) Ahmed Imaaz
- (Sri Lanka) Eranda Prasad
- (Bangladesh) Touhidul Alam
- (Maldives) Rilwan Waheed

1 own goal

- (Maldives) Moosa Yaamin (playing against Pakistan in the final)
