= Malé Sports Complex (Ekuveni) =

Multipurpose sport stadium in Malé, Maldives

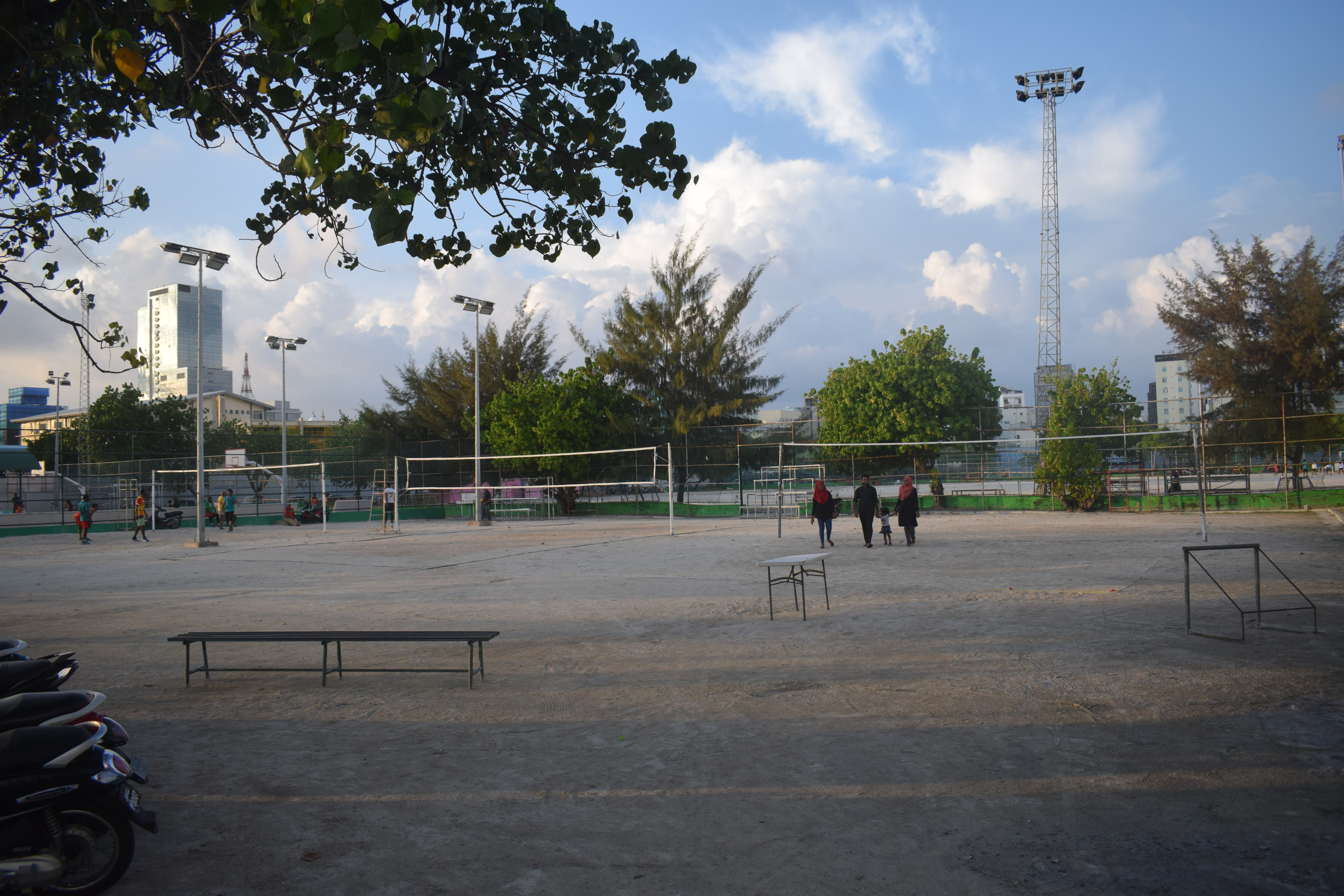
- Interactive map of Malé Sports Complex (Ekuveni)
- Former names: Stadium
- Location: Machchangolhi, Malé, Maldives
- Coordinates: 4°10′13.3384″N 73°30′23.0571″E
- Surface: Grass

Malé Sports Complex (Ekuveni) is a multi-purpose stadium in Malé, Maldives. It is used mostly for football matches. Sports Complex in Malé consisting of indoor and outdoor basketball courts, tennis courts, two football fields, volley area, and cricket area. The Football Association of Maldives House, Offices of Maldives Basketball Association, Maldives Cricket Board, Athletics Association and Maldives Badminton Association are also located in this complex.

== Ekuveni Track ==
Ekuveni Synthetic Track is a nine-lane running track that is located in the complex. It was remodeled with financial assistance of the Indian government and was opened in January 2021 by President Ibrahim Mohamed Solih and Sports Minister Ahmed Mahloof.

== Cricket lounge ==
The lounge was opened in 2021 by President Solih.
