= 2016 President's Cup (Maldives) =

President's Cup
Tournament details
- Country: Maldives
- City: 1
- Venue: 1
- Dates: 15 – 26 November 2016
- Teams: 6

Final positions
- Champions: Eagles (First title)
- Runners-up: TC Sports

Tournament statistics
- Matches played: 9
- Goals scored: 21 (2.33 per match)
- Top goal scorer(s): Asadhulla Abdulla (6 goals)

The 2016 President's Cup is the 66th season of the President's Cup. Maziya Sports and Recreation Club are the defending champions, having beaten New Radiant Sports Club in last season's final.

This is the second tournament under its current tournament format.

== Format ==
The first round, or group stage, was a competition between the 6 teams divided among two groups of three, where each group engaged in a round-robin tournament within itself. The two highest ranked teams in each group advanced to the knockout stage. Teams were awarded three points for a win and one for a draw. When comparing teams in a group over-all result came before head-to-head.

Tie-breaking criteria for group play
The ranking of teams in each group was based on the following criteria:
1. Number of points
2. Goal difference
3. Number of goals scored
4. Number of points obtained in matches between tied teams
5. Goal difference in matches between tied teams
6. Number of goals scored in matches between tied teams
7. Drawing of lots

For any match after the group stage, a draw after 90 minutes of regulation time was followed by two 15 minute periods of extra time to determine a winner. If the teams were still tied, a penalty shoot-out was held to determine a winner.

== Broadcasting rights ==
The broadcasting rights for some matches of 2016 Maldives President's Cup are given to the [www.psm.mv/ Public Service Media (PSM)].

== Group stage ==
=== Group 1 ===
Pos	Team	Pld	W	D	L	GF	GA	GD	Pts	Qualification
1	Eagles (Q)	2	2	0	0	5	1	+4	6	Advance to knockout stage
2	TC Sports (Q)	2	1	0	1	5	2	+3	3	Advance to knockout stage
3	New Radiant	1	0	0	1	0	7	−7	0	

Source: President's Cup
Rules for classification: Tie-breaking criteria
(Q) Qualified for the phase indicated
15 November
16:00

New Radiant	0 – 3	Eagles
	Report	15' (o.g.) Shaamiu; 66' Mubeen; 75' Riste

National Football Stadium, Male'
18 November
16:00

Eagles	2 – 1	TC Sports
Riste 9'; Mubeen 72'	Report	23' Fasir

National Football Stadium, Male'
21 November
16:00

New Radiant	0 – 4	TC Sports
	Report	5' Naiz; 23' Nizam; 37' Ibrahim; 72' (pen.) Fasir

National Football Stadium, Male'

=== Group 2 ===
Pos	Team	Pld	W	D	L	GF	GA	GD	Pts	Qualification
1	Maziya (Q)	2	2	0	0	10	1	+9	6	Advance to knockout stage
2	United Victory (Q)	2	1	0	1	2	8	−6	3	Advance to knockout stage
3	S. Feydhoo	2	0	0	2	1	4	−3	0	

Source: President's Cup
Rules for classification: Tie-breaking criteria
(Q) Qualified for the phase indicated
15 November
21:00

Maziya	2 – 1	S. Feydhoo
Asadhulla 24', 51'	Report	60' Mahudhee

National Football Stadium, Male'
18 November
21:00

S. Feydhoo	0 – 2	United Victory
	Report	66' (pen.) Rafael; 74' Haisham

National Football Stadium, Male'
21 November
21:00

Maziya	8 – 0	United Victory
Ashfaq 7', 70'; Asadhulla 14', 15', 30', 46'; Irufan 35'; Umair 71'	Report

National Football Stadium, Male'

== Knockout stage ==
Semi-finals
24 November – Male'
Eagles	3
United Victory	2
25 November – Male'
Maziya	0
TC Sports	2

Final
29 November – Male'
Eagles (aet)	1
TC Sports	0

=== Semi-finals ===
25 November
21:00

Eagles	3 – 2	United Victory
Riste 27'; Seddik 52', 90+2'	Report	20' Haisham; 58' Shimaz

National Football Stadium, Male'
26 November
21:00

Maziya	0 – 2	TC Sports
	Report	56' Nizam; 89' Naiz

National Football Stadium, Male'

=== Final ===
29 November
15:50

Eagles	1 – 0 (a.e.t.)	TC Sports
Rizuvan 91'	Report

National Football Stadium, Male'
Referee: Zaeem Ali

== Statistics ==
=== Scorers ===
Rank	Player	Club	Goals
1	(Maldives) Asadhulla Abdulla	Maziya	6
2	(North Macedonia) Riste Naumov	Eagles	3
3	(Maldives) Ibrahim Mubeen	Eagles	2
3	(Maldives) Ali Fasir	TC Sports	2
3	(Maldives) Ali Ashfaq	Maziya	2
3	(Syria) Mustafa Mohamed Seddik	Eagles	2
3	(Maldives) Ali Haisham	United Victory	2
3	(Maldives) Ahmed Nizam	TC Sports	2
3	(Maldives) Naiz Hassan	TC Sports	2
4	(Maldives) Ibrahim Mahudhee	S. Feydhoo	1
4	(Brazil) Rafael Betim Mart	United Victory	1
4	(Maldives) Ibrahim Waheed	TC Sports	1
4	(Maldives) Mohamed Irufan	Maziya	1
4	(Maldives) Mohamed Umair	Maziya	1
4	(Maldives) Hussain Shimaz	United Victory	1
4	(Maldives) Ahmed Rizuvan	Eagles	1

=== Assists ===
Rank	Player	Club	Assists
1	(Maldives) Ahmed Rizuvan	Eagles	2

Own goals

- (Maldives) Ali Shaamiu (New Radiant) (playing against Eagles)
