= Ahmed Imaz =

Maldivian footballer (born 1992)

Personal information
- Full name: Ahmed Imaz
- Date of birth: 12 April 1992 (age 34)
- Place of birth: Neykurendhoo, Maldives
- Height: 1.78 m (5 ft 10 in)
- Positions: Winger; forward

Team information
- Current team: Da Grande Sports Club
- Number: 7

Youth career
- 2011–2013: Club Eagles

Senior career*
Years	Team	Apps	(Gls)
2011–2015	Club Eagles		
2015	→ Maziya (loan)		
2016–2018	Maziya		
2019–	Da Grande Sports Club		

International career^{‡}
2012–	Maldives U23	?	(?)
2012–	Maldives	15	(1)
- * Club domestic league appearances and goals as of March 31, 2014 ‡ National team caps and goals as of November 19, 2019

Ahmed Imaz (born 12 April 1992) is a Maldivian footballer nicknamed "Aakko", who is currently playing for Da Grande Sports Club.

== Club career ==
Imaz signed for Club Eagles in 2011 and played three very successful seasons at the club, breaking through to the Maldives U23 and Maldives senior team in the following year.

On 24 December 2014, Imaz signed a one-year deal with Maziya. After one-year he extended his contract with Maziya and stayed until February 2019.

On 09 March 2019, Imaz signed for newly promoted club Da Grande Sports Club

== International career ==
Imaz made his debut in the Maldives' first match of 2012 Nehru Cup, in which they won 2-1 against Nepal on 23 August 2012, coming on to play in the 89th minute, replacing the captain Ali Ashfaq.

== Career statistics ==
=== International goals ===
==== Under–23 ====
Scores and results list Maldives U–23's goal tally first.

#	Date	Venue	Opponent	Score	Result	Competition
1.	25 June 2012	Hang Jebat Stadium, Malaysia	Tajikistan	0–1	2–1	2014 AFC U-22 Asian Cup Qualifiers
2.	5 November 2012	Jayathilake Sports Complex, Sri Lanka	Pakistan	0–1	0–1	2012 Mahinda Rajapaksa Int'l Trophy

=== International goals ===
Scores and results list Maldives' goal tally first.

No	Date	Venue	Opponent	Score	Result	Competition
1.	2 August 2015	Stade Baby-Larivière, Saint-André, Réunion	Seychelles	2–1	2–1	2015 Indian Ocean Island Games
2.	24 December 2015	Trivandrum International Stadium, Thiruvananthapuram, India	Bhutan	1–0	3–1	2015 SAFF Championship

== Honours ==
Maldives

- SAFF Championship: 2018
