= H.E. Mahinda Rajapaksa Under-23 International Football Trophy =

2012 football competition in Sri Lanka

- Founded: 2012
- Teams: 4
- Current champions: Maldives (1st title)
- Most championships: Maldives (1 title)

The H.E. Mahinda Rajapaksa Under-23 International Football Trophy was an association football competition of the men's national football teams of Under 23, organised by the Ministry of Sports in Sri Lanka and National Football Federation of Sri Lanka. It was only held in 2012.

== Results ==
Year	Host	Winners	Score	Runners-up	Number of teams
2012; Details	Sri Lanka	Maldives	2–1	Pakistan	4
