= FAM Youth Championship =

- Founded: 2011
- Region: Maldives
- Teams: 10
- Current champions: Eagles (4th title)
- Most championships: Eagles (4 titles)
- 2014 FAM Youth Championship

The FAM Youth Championship is a Maldivian football competition run by The Football Association of Maldives. It is contested between the U19 divisions of clubs.

== Past winners ==
Season	Champions	Runners-up
2011	Maziya Sports & Recreation Club	New Radiant Sports Club
2012	Victory Sports Club	Club Eagles
2013	Club Valencia	BG Sports Club
2014	Club Eagles	Maziya Sports & Recreation Club
2015	not held	not held
2016	Club Eagles	TC Sports Club
2017	Club Eagles	Maziya Sports & Recreation Club
2018	Club Green Streets	Club Eagles
2019	Club Eagles	TC Sports Club
2022	Club Eagles	Super United Sports
2024	TC Sports Club	Super United Sports
2025	Maziya Sports & Recreation Club	Club Eagles
2026	Maziya Sports & Recreation Club	New Radiant Sports Club

=== Winners table ===
Team	No. of titles
Club Eagles	4
Maziya Sports & Recreation Club	1
Victory Sports Club	1
Club Valencia	1
Club Green Streets	1

== 2014 Participants ==
=== Group 1 ===
- Club Valencia
- Club Eagles
- Mahibadhoo Sports Club
- Victory Sports Club
- Club Green Street
- TC Sports Club

=== Group 2 ===
- New Radiant Sports Club
- Maziya Sports & Recreation Club
- Vaikaradhoo Football Club
- Veyru Sports Club

=== Group 3 ===
- BG Sports Club
- Kelaa Naalhi Sports
- Club All Youth Linkage
- Eydhafushi Zuvaanunge Club
