= Asadhulla Abdulla =

Maldivian footballer (born 1990)

Personal information
- Date of birth: 19 October 1990 (age 36)
- Place of birth: A. Dh. Mahibadhoo, Maldives
- Position: Forward

Senior career*
Years	Team	Apps	(Gls)
2008–2009	Club All Youth Linkage		(4)
2010–2011	Club Valencia		(8)
2012–2022	Maziya		(105)

International career
	Maldives U23		(3)
2012–2022	Maldives	40	(9)
Medal record
Representing Maldives
SAFF Championship
Winner	2018 Bangladesh
- * Club domestic league appearances and goals

Asadhulla Abdulla (born 19 October 1990) was a Maldivian footballer who played for Maziya.

== International career ==
Abdulla made his international debut for the Maldives on 23 August, at their first match of the 2012 Nehru Cup against Nepal. He was replaced by Ahmed Rasheed in the 63rd minute. Abdulla scored his first senior international goal in his debut match, giving the Maldives the lead in the 6th minute.

== Career statistics ==
=== International ===
==== International goals ====
===== Under–23 =====
Scores and results list Maldives U–23's goal tally first.

#	Date	Venue	Opponent	Score	Result	Competition
1.	11 August 2010	Rasmee Dhandu Stadium, Malé	Singapore	1–0	1–0	Friendly
2.	3 November 2012	Jayathilake Sports Complex, Sri Lanka	Sri Lanka	0–1	0–3	2012 Mahinda Rajapaksa Int'l Trophy
3.	9 November 2012	Jayathilake Sports Complex, Sri Lanka	Pakistan	0–2	1–2	2012 M. Rajapaksa Int'l Trophy Final

===== Senior team =====
Scores and results list Maldives goal tally first.

No.	Date	Venue	Opponent	Score	Result	Competition
1.	23 August 2012	Nehru Stadium, Delhi, India	Nepal	1–0	2–0	2012 Nehru Cup
2.	12 February 2013	National Football Stadium, Malé, Maldives	Pakistan	1–0	1–1	Friendly
3.	2 September 2013	Dasarath Rangasala Stadium, Kathmandu Nepal	Sri Lanka	1–0	10–0	2013 SAFF Championship
4.	27 May 2014	National Football Stadium, Malé, Maldives	Philippines	2–1	2–3	2014 AFC Challenge Cup
5.	24 December 2015	Trivandrum International Stadium, Thiruvananthapuram, India	Bhutan	2–1	3–1	2015 SAFF Championship
6.	29 March 2016	National Football Stadium, Malé, Maldives	Bhutan	1–1	4–2	2018 FIFA World Cup qualification
7.	1 September 2016	National Football Stadium, Malé, Maldives	Bangladesh	1–0	5–0	Friendly
8.	1 September 2016	National Football Stadium, Malé, Maldives	Bangladesh	2–0	5–0	Friendly
9.	1 September 2016	National Football Stadium, Malé, Maldives	Bangladesh	4–0	5–0	Friendly

== Honours ==
Maldives

- SAFF Championship: 2018
