= 2013 Maldives FA Cup =

Maldives FA Cup
Tournament details
- Country: Maldives
- Teams: 8

Final positions
- Champions: New Radiant (11th title)
- Runners-up: Maziya

The 2013 Maldives FA Cup was the 26th edition of the Maldives FA Cup.

The cup winner were guaranteed a place in the 2014 AFC Cup.

== Quarterfinals ==
Team 1	Score	Team 2
2 August 2013
Maziya	1–0	Valencia
4 August 2013
All Youth Linkage	2–1	VB
5 August 2013
New Radiant	w.o. (Note: Victory refused to play the match, with the club’s training halted due to unpaid wages.)	Victory
6 August 2013
Eagles	2–1	BG Sports

== Semifinals ==
Team 1	Score	Team 2
29 September 2013
Maziya	6–1	All Youth Linkage
30 September 2013
New Radiant	3–0	Eagles

== Third place match ==
Team 1	Score	Team 2
3 October 2013
Eagles	2–1	All Youth Linkage

== Final ==
Team 1	Score	Team 2
4 October 2013
New Radiant	1–0	Maziya
