= Ahmed Rizuvan =

Maldivian footballer

Personal information
- Full name: Ahmed Rizuvan
- Date of birth: 4 June 1995 (age 31)
- Place of birth: K. Dhiffushi, Maldives
- Position: Striker

Team information
- Current team: Victory
- Number: 11

Youth career
- 2013–2015: Eagles

Senior career*
Years	Team	Apps	(Gls)
2015–2026	Eagles	51	(105)
2017	→ G. Dh. Thinadhoo (loan)	15	(6)
2025–2026	→ Victory (loan)	8	(0)
2026–	→ Victory	0	(0)

International career^{‡}
2013	Maldives U19	4	(1)
2014–	Maldives U23		
2016–	Maldives	10	(1)
- * Club domestic league appearances and goals as of September 1, 2016 ‡ National team caps and goals as of June 2025

Ahmed Rizuvan (born 4 June 1995), known by his nickname Rizey, is a Maldivian professional footballer who is currently playing for Victory Sports Club.

Rizuwan holds the record in October 2018, after scoring five hat-tricks in five consecutive matches of the Dhiraagu Dhivehi Premier League.

== International career ==
Rizuvan made his debut in an international friendly against Bangladesh on 1 September 2016, in which he replaced Ali Fasir in the 58th minute. Maldives went on to win the game by 5–0 at the National Football Stadium.

He scored his first international goal on 5 June 2025 against Singapore during a friendly at the Bishan Stadium.

=== International goals ===
==== Under-19 ====
Scores and results list Maldives U–19's goal tally first.

#	Date	Venue	Opponent	Score	Result	Competition
1.	4 October 2013	Prince Mohammed Stadium, Zarqa	Afghanistan	1–0	1–0	2014 AFC U-19 Championship Qualifiers

==== International goals ====
No	Date	Venue	Opponent	Score	Result	Competition
1	5 June 2025	Bishan Stadium, Singapore	Singapore	1–3	1–3	Friendly

== See also ==
- List of footballers who achieved hat-trick records
