= Mahibadhoo Sports Club =

Maldivian football club

Mahibadhoo
- Full name: Mahibadhoo Sports Club
- Ground: Pelé Stadium
- League: Second Division
- 2020: 6th
Home colours	Away colours

Mahibadhoo Sports Club is an association football club based in Mahibadhoo, Maldives. The club competes in Second Division, the second tier of the Maldives football league system.

== Club history ==
The current club was officially established in 2010 but, in previous incarnations, the club's history dates back to early 2000s. In the 2016 season, Mahibadhoo Sports Club were awarded with official membership of the Football Association of Maldives.

== Head coaches ==
- 2013: (Belgium) Ivan Minnaert
- 2014: (Maldives) Mohamed Shiyaz
- 2015–: (Bulgaria) Yordan Ivanov Stoikov

== Honours ==
=== League ===
- Second Division
  - Runners-up (promoted via play-off): 2013
- Third Division
  - Champions: 2007, 2012
