= Maldives national under-23 football team =

Maldives
- Nickname: Red Snappers
- Association: Football Association of Maldives
- Confederation: AFC (Asia)
- Sub-confederation: SAFF (South Asia)
- Head coach: Ali Suzain
- FIFA code: MDV
First colours	Second colours	Third colours

First international
- Maldives 0–4 south korea

The Maldives national Under-23 football team, also known as Maldives Under-23s or Maldives U23(s), is considered to be the feeder team for the Maldives national football team, and is controlled by the Football Association of Maldives.

== Asian Games ==
=== 2002 ===
This was the Maldives U-23s' first competitive tournament. They were eliminated from the preliminary round, after being defeated 4–0 to South Korea, 3–1 to Malaysia and 5–0 to Oman. The only goal for the Maldives was scored by Ibrahim Fazeel.

=== 2006 ===
In this year, Maldives were drawn to play in the Group A of the second round, alongside India, Hong Kong and Iran. Ashad Ali scored the only goal in the 3–1 loss against Iran. In the match against India, Ali Ashfaq scored the equalizing goal for Maldives, but they couldn't hold India till the end and lost for 2–1 as India scored the winning goal in the 89th minute of the game. The last match of the group was against Hong Kong. Maldives lost 1–0 to them as Maldives were conceded in the 11th minute of the game.

=== 2010 ===
Maldives ended up the competition at the 3rd position of Group F in the 2010 Asian Games held at China. They lost the first match, 3–0 to Oman, but they managed to draw with a score of 0–0 against Pakistan and Thailand.

== AFC U-23 Asian Cup ==
=== 2014 AFC U-22 Asian Cup Qualification ===
In 2012 it was announced that Maldives U23 would participate in the qualifying round of the inaugural AFC U-23 Asian Cup in June 2012.

== Competitive record ==
=== Olympic Games ===
Olympics Record
Host nation / Year	Result	Position	GP	W	D*	L	GS	GA
(Greece) 1896	No football tournament was held							
(France) 1900	did not enter							
(United States) 1904	did not enter							
(United Kingdom) 1908	did not enter							
(Sweden) 1912	did not enter							
(Belgium) 1920	did not enter							
(France) 1924	did not enter							
(Netherlands) 1928	did not enter							
(United States) 1932	No football tournament was held							
(Nazi Germany) 1936	did not enter							
(United Kingdom) 1948	did not enter							
(Finland) 1952	did not enter							
(Australia) 1956	did not enter							
(Italy) 1960	did not enter							
(Japan) 1964	did not enter							
(Mexico) 1968	did not enter							
(West Germany) 1972	did not enter							
(Canada) 1976	did not enter							
(Soviet Union) 1980	did not enter							
(United States) 1984	did not enter							
(South Korea) 1988	did not enter							
(Spain) 1992	did not enter							
(United States) 1996	did not enter							
(Australia) 2000	did not enter							
(Greece) 2004	did not enter							
(China) 2008	did not qualify							
(United Kingdom) 2012	did not qualify							
Total	-	0/25	0	0	0	0	0	0

*Denotes draws including knockout matches decided on penalty kicks.

=== Asian Games ===
Asian Games Record
Host nation / Year	Result	Position	GP	W	D*	L	GS	GA
(South Korea) 2002	Round 1	22	3	0	0	3	1	12
(Qatar) 2006	Round 2	19	3	0	0	3	2	6
(China) 2010	Round 1	17	3	0	2	1	3	3
(South Korea) 2014	Round 1	21	3	1	0	2	3	8
Total	-	4/4	12	1	2	9	9	29

*Denotes draws including knockout matches decided on penalty kicks.

=== AFC U-23 Asian Cup ===
AFC U-23 Asian Cup
Host nation / Year	Result	Position	GP	W	D*	L	GS	GA
(Oman) 2014	did not qualify							
(Qatar) 2016	did not qualify							
Total	-	0/0	0	0	0	0	0	0

*Denotes draws including knockout matches decided on penalty kicks.

=== H.E. Mahinda Rajapaksa U-23 International Football Trophy ===
H.E. Mahinda Rajapaksa Under-23 International Football Trophy
Host nation / Year	Result	Position	GP	W	D*	L	GS	GA
(Sri Lanka) 2012	Champions	1st	4	3	0	1	6	2
Total	1 Title	1/1	4	3	0	1	6	2

*Denotes draws including knockout matches decided on penalty kicks.

== Coaching staff ==
Position	Name
Team Manager	(Maldives) Mohamed Adhuham
Head coach	(Maldives) Ali Suzain
Assistant coach	(Maldives) Mohammed Shahid
Assistant coach	(Maldives) Sabah Mohamed
Goalkeeping coach	(Maldives) Haseeb Hameed
Team Doctor	(Maldives) Hisham Ali Zaki

== Current squad ==
The following players were called up to the squad for 2022 AFC U-23 Asian Cup qualification

No.	Pos.	Player	Date of birth (age)	Caps	Goals	Club
1	GK	Ali Naajih	December 8, 1999 (age 26)	2		(Football Association of Maldives) United Victory
2	GK	Hassan Aleef Ahmed	October 1, 2000 (age 26)			(Football Association of Maldives) Eagles
3	DF	Ali Ajfan Amjad				(Football Association of Maldives) Eydhafushi
4	DF	Hassan Nahwaash	March 28, 2000 (age 26)	1		(Football Association of Maldives) Maziya
5	MF	Moosa Azeem Hassan		2		(Football Association of Maldives) United Victory
6	DF	Ishaq Rasheedh		1		(Football Association of Maldives) Green Streets
7	DF	Husain Faisal	May 15, 1999 (age 27)	2		(Football Association of Maldives) Valencia
8	DF	Hassan Eanaaz		2		(Football Association of Maldives) TC
9	DF	Hamdhoon Abdhul Latheef		1		(Football Association of Maldives) TC
10	DF	Ahnaf Rasheed	November 23, 2001 (age 24)	1		(Football Association of Maldives) Super United
11	DF	Ahmed Naahil Ibrahim	July 3, 2002 (age 24)			(Football Association of Maldives) Green Streets
12	DF	Haisham Hassan	July 21, 1999 (age 27)	2		(Football Association of Maldives) Maziya
13	MF	Shaifulla Ibrahim	May 29, 1999 (age 27)			(Football Association of Maldives) Eagles
14	MF	Hussain Ahusam Moosa	March 20, 2001 (age 25)	2		(Football Association of Maldives) TC
15	MF	Abdulla Yaameen	December 30, 2001 (age 24)	2		(Football Association of Maldives) Valencia
16	MF	Zain Zafar	April 20, 2003 (age 23)	2		(Football Association of Maldives) Eagles
17	MF	Ismail Zaan Amir	October 11, 2000 (age 26)	2		(Football Association of Maldives) Valencia
18	FW	Zayaan Naseer		2		(Football Association of Maldives) TC
19	FW	Haisham Rasheed		1		(Football Association of Maldives) TC
20	FW	Ahmad Bassam	January 17, 2001 (age 25)	2		(Football Association of Maldives) United Victory
22	FW	Nishaam Mohamed Rasheed	January 31, 1999 (age 27)	2		(Football Association of Maldives) TC
23	FW	Mohamed Jailam	October 13, 1999 (age 27)	2		(Football Association of Maldives) Green Streets
25	FW	Hassan Nazeem	May 24, 2001 (age 25)	2		(Football Association of Maldives) Maziya

== Coaches ==
Name	Nat	Period
István Urbányi	(Hungary)	2011–2013
Drago Mamić	(Croatia)	2014
Assad Abdul Ghanee	(Maldives)	2015
René Hiddink	(Netherlands)	2021–

== See also ==
- Maldives national football team
