= 2026 President's Cup (Maldives) =

President's Cup
- Odi Sports Club players celebrate their win, 24 February 2026

Tournament details
- Country: Maldives
- City: 1
- Venue: 1
- Dates: Play-offs: 8 February 2026; Competition proper: 10 – 24 February 2026
- Teams: Competition proper: 6 Total: 8

Final positions
- Champions: Odi Sports Club
- Runners-up: Maziya

Tournament statistics
- Matches played: 9
- Goals scored: 25 (2.78 per match)
- Top goal scorer(s): Ahzam Rasheed (Odi); 3 goals

Awards
- Best player: Ahzam Rasheed (Odi)

The 2026 President's Cup was the 70th edition of the President's Cup, the national knockout football competition in the Maldives.

Odi Sports Club won the tournament after defeating defending champions Maziya S&RC 6–5 on penalties in the final following a 1–1 draw. It marked Odi's first President's Cup title, achieved during the club's debut season in the Maldivian top division.

== Format ==
Six teams competed in the competition. The top four teams from the 2025–26 Dhivehi Premier League qualified directly for the group stage, while teams finishing fifth to eighth contested play-offs for the remaining two places.

The tournament draw was held on 2 February 2026 at the National Football Stadium in Malé.

== Qualification ==
Qualification for the tournament was based on the standings of the 2025–26 Dhivehi Premier League.

Pos	Team	Pld	W	D	L	GF	GA	GD	Pts	Qualification or relegation
1	Maziya	18	15	3	0	53	9	+44	48	Group Stage
2	Odi Sports	18	12	3	3	40	12	+28	39	Group Stage
3	New Radiant	18	11	4	3	42	16	+26	37	Group Stage
4	Buru Sports	18	8	5	5	40	25	+15	29	Group Stage
5	Eagles	18	6	5	7	30	33	−3	23	Play-offs
6	Victory	18	6	3	9	18	31	−13	21	Play-offs
7	TC Sports	18	6	3	9	18	32	−14	21	Play-offs
8	Green Streets	18	3	3	12	17	43	−26	12	Play-offs
9	Valencia	18	3	3	12	12	40	−28	12	
10	United Victory	18	3	2	13	15	44	−29	11	

Source: Football Association of Maldives
Rules for classification: 1) Points; 2) Head-to-head points; 3) Head-to-head goal difference; 4) Head-to-head goals scored; 5) Goal difference; 6) Goals scored.

== Play-offs ==
The play-off matches were played on 8 February 2026. Club Eagles and Victory Sports Club entered the competition as play-off winners.

8 February 2026
16:00

Club Eagles	6–0	Green Streets
El Sayed Mahmoud 16' (o.g.); Mahudhee 30', 35', 52'; Shamhaan 73'; Haafiz 76'	Report

National Football Stadium, Malé
Referee: Mohamed Javiz

8 February 2026
21:00

Victory Sports Club	2–0	TC Sports Club
Nasooh 31'; Rizuvan 58'	Report

National Football Stadium, Malé
Referee: Raeef Rauf

== Group stage ==
The group stage consisted of two groups of three teams. The top two teams from each group advanced to the semi-finals.

=== Group 1 ===
Pos	Team	Pld	W	D	L	GF	GA	GD	Pts	Qualification
1	Maziya S&RC	2	2	0	0	3	0	+3	6	Advance to knockout stage
2	Buru Sports Club	2	1	0	1	2	2	0	3	Advance to knockout stage
3	Victory Sports Club	2	0	0	2	1	4	−3	0	

Source: President's Cup

==== Matches ====
10 February 2026
16:00

Maziya S&RC	1–0	Buru Sports Club
Mammadzada 19'	Report

National Football Stadium, Malé
Referee: Hussain Sinan

13 February 2026
21:00

Buru Sports Club	2–1	Victory Sports Club
Hudson 47', 81'	Report	77' Lačný

National Football Stadium, Malé
Referee: Abdulla Shathir

16 February 2026
21:00

Maziya S&RC	2–0	Victory Sports Club
Mendigutxia 36'; Haisham 39'	Report

National Football Stadium, Malé
Attendance: 120
Referee: Raeef Rauf

=== Group 2 ===
Pos	Team	Pld	W	D	L	GF	GA	GD	Pts	Qualification
1	Odi Sports Club	2	1	1	0	5	3	+2	4	Advance to knockout stage
2	New Radiant SC	2	1	1	0	3	2	+1	4	Advance to knockout stage
3	Club Eagles	2	0	0	2	3	6	−3	0	

Source: President's Cup

==== Matches ====
10 February 2026
21:00

Odi Sports Club	1–1	New Radiant SC
Inaan 55' (o.g.)	Report	13' Bility

National Football Stadium, Malé
Attendance: 68
Referee: Ismail Mohamed

13 February 2026
16:00

New Radiant SC	2–1	Club Eagles
Marvin 13' (o.g.); Silva 57'	Report	45+2' Hisam

National Football Stadium, Malé
Attendance: 300
Referee: Zaheer Hussain

16 February 2026
16:00

Odi Sports Club	4–2	Club Eagles
Ahzam 59', 71'; Aiham I 87'; Ayaaz 90'	Report	20' Easa; 90+2' Mahudhee

National Football Stadium, Malé
Referee: Mohamed Javiz

== Knockout stage ==
=== Semi-finals ===
20 February 2026
22:00

Maziya S&RC	2–2	New Radiant SC
Aiham II 28', 40'	Report	51' Gero; 67' Ashfaq
Penalties
Hamza (penalty scored); Mammadzada (penalty scored); Aisam (penalty missed); Aiham II (penalty scored); Regan (penalty scored)	4–3	(penalty scored) Gero; (penalty missed) Bility; (penalty scored) Fasir; (penalty missed) Ashfaq; (penalty scored) Husaam

National Football Stadium, Malé
Referee: Afsheen Naseer

21 February 2026
22:00

Odi Sports Club	2–0	Buru Sports Club
Islam 51'; Ahzam 63'	Report

National Football Stadium, Malé
Attendance: 56
Referee: Abdulla Shathir

=== Final ===
24 February 2026
22:00

Maziya S&RC	1–1	Odi Sports Club
Naiz 3'	Report	14' Marsh-Brown
Penalties
Hamza (penalty scored); Mammadzada (penalty scored); Ilan (penalty scored); Aisam (penalty missed); Aiham II (penalty missed); Regan (penalty scored); Sifaau (penalty missed)	5–6	(penalty scored) Barnabás; (penalty missed) Ibrahim; (penalty missed) Rasheed; (penalty scored) Marsh-Brown; (penalty scored) Islam; (penalty scored) Ogungbe; (penalty scored) Aiham I

National Football Stadium, Malé
Attendance: 2,341
Referee: Hussain Sinan

== See also ==
- President's Cup (Maldives)
- 2025–26 Dhivehi Premier League
