= 2026 Maldives FA Cup =

Maldives FA Cup
Tournament details
- Country: Maldives
- Teams: 8

Final positions
- Champions: New Radiant (13th title)
- Runners-up: TC Sports Club
- Third place: Buru Sports Club
- Fourth place: Blue Sports CLub

Tournament statistics
- Matches played: 8
- Goals scored: 32 (4 per match)
- Top goal scorer: Ali Fasir (7 goals)

The 2026 Maldives FA Cup will be the 31st edition of the Maldives FA Cup, the premier knockout football competition in the Maldives organized by the Football Association of Maldives. The tournament forms part of the 2025–26 Maldivian football season and will be held from 10 to 18 April 2026.

The competition marks the return of the FA Cup after a three-year absence, with the previous edition having been held in 2022. Maziya S&RC are the defending champions, having defeated Club Valencia 2–0 in the final.

== Teams ==
A total of eight teams are participating in the tournament. These include top seven clubs from the 2025–26 Dhivehi Premier League, along with one newly formed Blue Sports Club, a club established in 2025, making its debut in professional Maldivian football.

Notably, Club Valencia, runners-up of the previous edition and five-time winner, will not feature in the tournament.

== Quarter finals ==
The draw was made on 5 March 2026, and took place at VIP Room of the National Football Stadium, Malé.

10 April 2026
16:00

Club Eagles	2–2	Blue Sports Club
Easa 60' (pen.); Zain 76'	Report	11' Faalih; 86' Iyad
Penalties
Easa (penalty missed); Zain (penalty scored); Zuhaan (penalty missed); Toshpulatov (penalty scored); Sameeh (penalty scored)	3–4	(penalty missed) Addo Kuffour; (penalty scored) Shiyaan; (penalty scored) Iyad; (penalty scored) Acquaye; (penalty scored) Jinah

National Football Stadium, Malé
Referee: Raeef Rauf

10 April 2026
21:00

Odi Sports Club	0–4	New Radiant
	Report	20', 30', 61' Fasir; 86' Gero

National Football Stadium, Malé
Attendance: 350
Referee: Abdulla Shathir

11 April 2026
16:00

Victory Sports Club	1–3	TC Sports Club
Rizuvan 45+3'	Report	49' (o.g.) Shamis; 88' Aiham H. 90+5' Dhaanish

National Football Stadium, Malé
Referee: Afsheen Naseer

11 April 2026
21:00

Buru Sports Club	2–2	Maziya S&RC
Thoif 70'; Diagne 72'	Report	51' (pen.) Hamza; 62' Ilan
Penalties
Alaa (penalty scored); Ahmed (penalty scored); Hamdhaan (penalty missed); Yaameen (penalty scored); Hudson (penalty scored); Shamweel (penalty missed); Diagne (penalty scored); Naisam (penalty scored)	6–5	(penalty missed) Samooh; (penalty scored) Ilan; (penalty scored) Aiham II; (penalty scored) Hamza; (penalty missed) Almeida; (penalty scored) Aisam; (penalty missed) Sifaau

National Football Stadium, Malé
Referee: Adam Fazeel

== Semi finals ==
15 April 2026
16:00

Blue Sports Club	0–7	New Radiant
	Report	3' Bility; 18' (pen.), 47', 82' Fasir; 21', 45+3' Gero; 41' Raif

National Football Stadium, Malé
Referee: Mohamed Javiz

15 April 2026
21:00

TC Sports Club	2–0	Buru Sports Club
Boadu 64', 90+6'	Report

National Football Stadium, Malé
Referee: Hussain Sinan

== Third place match ==
18 April 2026
16:00

Blue Sports Club	1–3	Buru Sports Club
	Report

National Football Stadium, Malé
Referee: Mohamed Javiz

== Final ==
18 April 2026
21:00

New Radiant	3–0	TC Sports Club
	Report

National Football Stadium, Malé
