= 2026 Maldives Cup Winners' Cup =

Maldives Cup Winners' Cup
Tournament details
- Country: Maldives
- City: 1
- Venue: 1
- Dates: 3 – 19 August 2026
- Teams: 4

Final positions
- Champions: Maziya (1st title)
- Runners-up: New Radiant

Tournament statistics
- Matches played: 7
- Goals scored: 27 (3.86 per match)

The 2026 Maldives Cup Winners' Cup will be the 12th edition of the Maldives Cup Winners' Cup, an annual football competition for clubs in the Maldivian football league system that were successful in its major competitions in the preceding season.

The competition is being held after 18 years. On 2 August 2026, it was announced that the competition would be played in a round robin phase with forur teams and the top two teams will play the final.

== Qualification ==
The tournament was supposed to feature the winner and runner-up of the 2025–26 Dhivehi Premier League with champions of 2026 Maldives FA Cup and 2026 President's Cup. However, as 2025–26 Dhivehi Premier League top 3 teams were the winners of three major competitions, the extra spot was awarded to Premier League fourth-placed Buru Sports Club.

=== Qualified teams ===
The following four teams qualified for the tournament.

Team	Method of qualification	Appearance	Last appearance as	Previous performance	
Team	Method of qualification	Appearance	Last appearance as	Winner(s)	Runners-up
Maziya	2025–26 Dhivehi Premier League winners	2nd	1999 group stage	–	–
Odi Sports Club	2026 President's Cup winners	Debut	none	–	–
New Radiant	2026 Maldives FA Cup winners	12th	2008 winners	4	3
Buru Sports Club	2025–26 Dhivehi Premier League fourth place	Debut	none	–	–

== Round Robin ==
All the four teams will play each other in a round robin phase and the top two teams will play the final.

- All matches are played in Malé, Maldives.
- Times listed are UTC+05:00.

Key to colours in group tables
Advance to Final

Pos	Team	Pld	W	D	L	GF	GA	GD	Pts	Status
1	New Radiant	3	2	1	0	11	4	+7	7	Advance to Final
2	Maziya	3	2	1	0	5	3	+2	7	Advance to Final
3	Odi Sports	3	1	0	2	6	7	−1	3	
4	Buru Sports	3	0	0	3	1	9	−8	0	

Updated to match(es) played on 6 August 2026. Source: Football Association of Maldives
Rules for classification: 1) points; 2) head-to-head points; 3) head-to-head goal difference; 4) goal difference; 5) number of goals scored;

3 August 2026
16:00

New Radiant	5–0	Buru Sports
Dori 1', 60', 63'; Fasir 58'; Bility 73'	Report

National Football Stadium, Malé
Referee: Afsheen Naseer

3 August 2026
21:00

Maziya	2–1	Odi Sports
Nassah 18'; Aiham II 78'	Report	28' Muzdhan

National Football Stadium, Malé
Referee: Raeef Rauf

6 August 2026
16:00

Maziya	2–1	Buru Sports
Aisam 48'; Kuku 53'	Report	43+3' Areen

National Football Stadium, Malé
Referee: Abdulla Shathir

6 August 2026
21:00

New Radiant	5–3	Odi Sports
Dori 4', 19', 51'; Ethan 39'; Amdhan 78'	Report	87' (pen.) Ibrahim; 90' Muzdhan; 90+4' Sakhaau

National Football Stadium, Malé
Attendance: 200
Referee: Ismail Mohamed

15 August 2026
16:00

Odi Sports	2–0	Buru Sports
Muzdhan 2', 49'

National Football Stadium, Malé
Attendance: 113
Referee: Hussain Zaheer

16 August 2026 (Note: The Odi SC v Buru SC match, originally scheduled to be played on 15 August 2026, 21:00 UTC+5, was rescheduled.)
21:00

Maziya	1–1	New Radiant
Gomez 63'		72' Husaam

National Football Stadium, Malé
Attendance: 152
Referee: Hussain Sinan

== Final ==
19 August 2026 (Note: The Final Match, originally scheduled to be played on 18 August 2026, 21:00 UTC+5, was rescheduled.)
21:00

New Radiant	2–2	Maziya
Fasir 16', 35'	Report	2' Ilan; 28' Aiham II
Penalties
Silva (penalty scored); Dori (penalty missed); Abdulla (penalty scored); Yaamin (penalty missed)	2–4	(penalty scored) Ilan; (penalty scored) Aisam; (penalty scored) Haisham; (penalty scored) Kuku

National Football Stadium, Malé
Attendance: 375
Referee: Adam Fazeel

== See also ==
- President's Cup (Maldives)
- 2025–26 Dhivehi Premier League
- Maldives FA Cup
