= Ethan Ibrahim Zaki =

Maldivian footballer (born 2008)

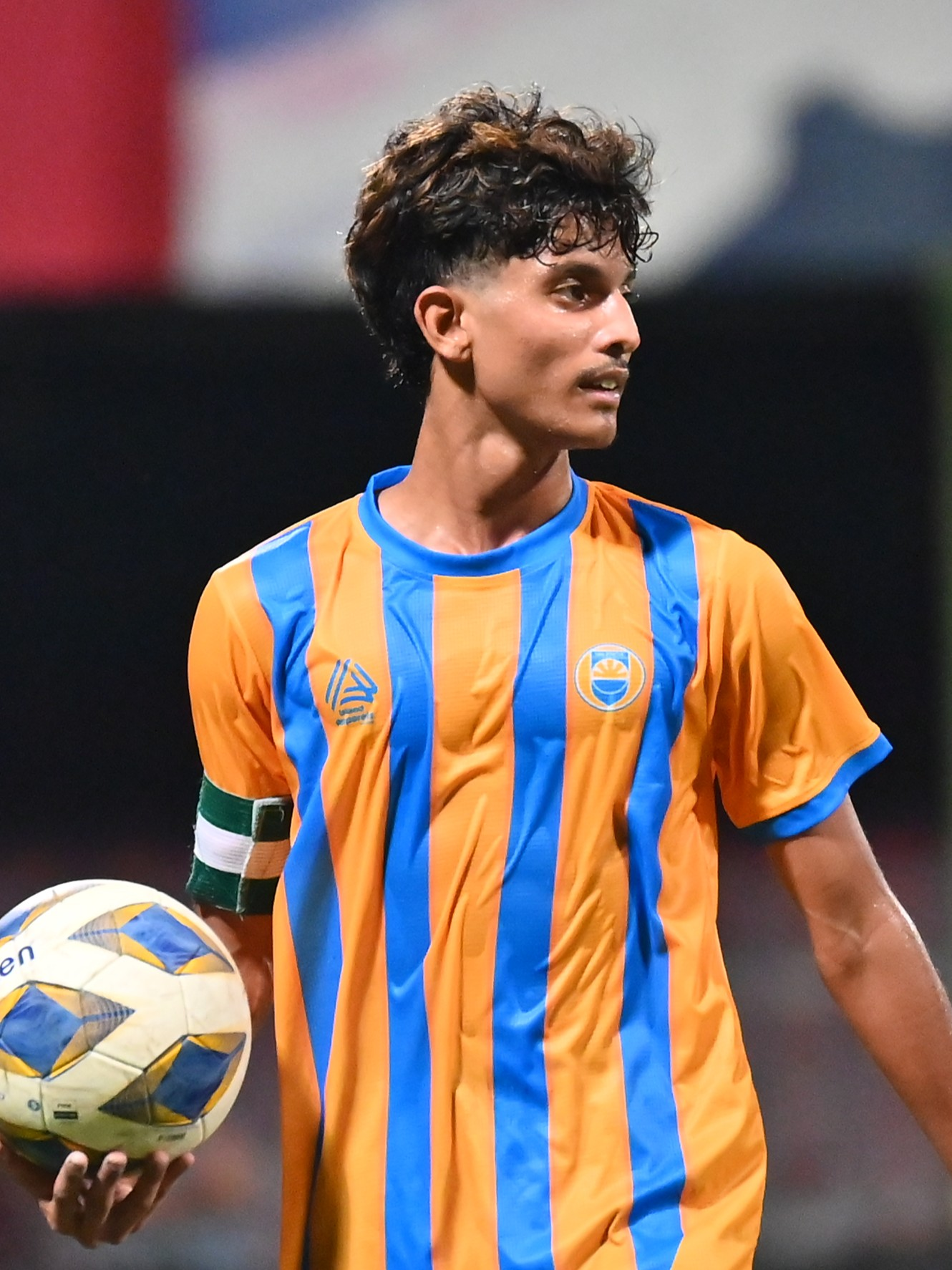
- Ethan with Valencia in 2025

Personal information
- Full name: Ethan Ibrahim Zaki
- Date of birth: November 6, 2008 (age 17)
- Place of birth: K. Malé, Maldives
- Positions: Forward; winger; attacking midfielder

Team information
- Current team: New Radiant
- Number: 19

Youth career
- 2011–2013: ETFA
- 2014–2016: New Radiant
- 2017–2020: TC Sports Club
- 2019–2023: Iskandhar School
- 2021–2023: Club Valencia
- 2023–2025: EF Huesca
- 2024–2026: Club Valencia
- 2026–: New Radiant

Senior career*
Years	Team	Apps	(Gls)
2023	Club Valencia	8	(1)
2025–2026	Club Valencia	18	(1)
2026–	New Radiant	0	(0)

International career^{‡}
2023	Maldives U16	3	(1)
2024	Maldives U17	6	(0)
2025–	Maldives U19	3	(1)
2026–	Maldives U20	3	(0)
2025–	Maldives	1	(0)
- * Club domestic league appearances and goals as of 4 February 2026 ‡ National team caps and goals as of 27 March 2026

Ethan Ibrahim Zaki (Dhivehi: އީތަން އިބްރާހީމް ޒަކީ; born 6 November 2008) is a Maldivian professional footballer who plays as a forward, winger or attacking midfielder for New Radiant, and the Maldives national team.

He made his senior debut for Club Valencia in 2023 at the age of 14. In 2025, he became the youngest captain in Dhivehi Premier League history at the age of 16.

== Early life and youth career ==
Born in Malé, Ethan began playing football at an early age, joining ETFA in 2011 when he was three years old. He later progressed through the youth systems of New Radiant and TC Sports Club before joining Club Valencia’s youth setup in 2021.

He attended Ghiyasuddin International School and Iskandhar School. During his youth career, he also gained experience abroad, including training periods in Sri Lanka, Thailand, and Spain, as well as participation in youth tournaments in Europe.

In 2020, he was selected for a virtual training programme organised by The Next Generation Sports, earning an opportunity to train in Spain.

== Club career ==
=== Club Valencia ===
Ethan made his senior debut for Club Valencia on 14 April 2023 in the 2023 President’s Cup against Super United Sports at the age of 14 years and 159 days.

He made his Dhivehi Premier League debut on 8 May 2023 against TC Sports Club.

On 8 August 2023, Ethan scored his first league goal against United Victory, scoring the opener and becoming the youngest goalscorer in Dhivehi Premier League history at the age of 14 years and 276 days, breaking team-mate Yoosuf Ayaan Amir’s three-day-old record; however, Valencia lost the match 2–1. His record was later broken in the next game week by then team-mate Mohamed Ilan Imran, scoring against Club Green Streets.

=== EF Huesca ===
Following the 2023 season, Ethan was invited by the Spanish Academy Escuela de Fútbol Huesca to play for their under-16 team under one year contract, later signed a contract extension for another year to play with their under-18 team.

During his time with the under-18 team, he came to Maldives during the 2025 New Year break and played two games for Club Valencia under-16 in the 2024 Dhivehi Youth League. He went back after scoring two goals, assisting one and with one Man of the Match award.

=== Return to Valencia and becoming the youngest captain ===
At the start of the 2025–26 season, Ethan was named captain of Club Valencia, becoming the youngest captain in Maldivian top-flight history at the age of 16 years and 318 days.

In his first match as captain on 20 September 2025 against Club Green Streets, Ethan scored the opening goal and later assisted Buba Sylla in a 2–1 win, also named as Man of the Match. On 7 November 2025, he again won Man of the Match after 1–0 win against Victory Sports Club assisting their only goal scored by Ahmed Athwan Ali.

=== New Radiant ===
Ethan joined New Radiant on 25 June 2026, signing for their under 19 team as the captain. He captained them in 2026 FAM Youth Champiosnship in which they reached the final with his one goal and six assists in four games. New Radiant lost the final 4–1 to Maziya, while Ethan missed the game due to an injury.

On 22 July 2026, he signed his senior contract with the club. Ethan made his debut in the 2026 Maldivian FA Charity Shield on 31 July 2026 against Maziya. Both teams were held to a 3–3 draw with an assist from Ethan to Ali Fasir to double their lead during the first half. New radiant lost the final 5–3 on penalties. On 6 August 2026, Ethan scored his first senior goal for New Radiant against Odi Sports Club in the 2026 Maldives Cup Winners' Cup group stage match. New Radiant went on to win the game 5–3, securing a place in the final.

== International career ==
Ethan represented Maldives at multiple youth levels before receiving his first senior call-up in November 2025, by coach Mohamed Siyaz.

On 18 November 2025, he made his debut at the age of 17 years and 12 days, in a 2–0 defeat to the Philippines during the 2027 AFC Asian Cup qualification. Ethan entered as a 74th-minute substitute for Hamza Mohamed.

== Style of play ==
Ethan is a left-footed attacker who typically operates on the right wing and is capable of playing in multiple attacking roles.

== Career statistics ==
=== Club ===
As of match played 10 September 2026

Appearances and goals by club, season and competition
Club	Season	League			FA Cup		President's Cup		Asia		Other		Total	
Club	Season	Division	Apps	Goals	Apps	Goals	Apps	Goals	Apps	Goals	Apps	Goals	Apps	Goals
Valencia	2023	Premier League	8	1	—		2	0	—		—		10	1
Valencia	2025–26	Premier League	18	1	0	0	0	0	—		—		18	1
New Radiant	2026–27	Premier League	1	0	0	0	0	0	—		5 (Note: One appearance in 2026 Maldivian FA Charity Shield, four appearances and one goal in 2026 Maldives Cup Winners' Cup)	1	6	1
Career total			27	2	0	0	2	0	—		5	1	34	3

=== International ===
As of match played 18 November 2025

Maldives national team
Year	Apps	Goals
2025	1	0
Total	1	0
