= Hussain Niyaz Mohamed =

Maldivian footballer

Personal information
- Full name: Hussain Niyaz Mohamed
- Date of birth: 19 March 1987 (age 39)
- Place of birth: Mahibadhoo, Maldives
- Height: 1.71 m (5 ft 7 1/2 in)
- Position: Winger

Team information
- Current team: Victory
- Number: 16

Senior career*
Years	Team	Apps	(Gls)
2007–2010	Victory		
2011–2012	Maziya		
2013	New Radiant		
2014	Mahibadhoo		
2015–2017	Maziya		
2020–2021	Valencia		
2022	JJ Sports Club		
2023–	Victory		

International career
–2010	Maldives U23		
2010–2017	Maldives	19	(2)
- * Club domestic league appearances and goals

Hussain Niyaz Mohamed (born 19 March 1987), nicknamed Bokury, is a Maldivian professional footballer who plays as a winger for Victory Sports Club. He is known for his pace, dribbling on the wide flanks.

== Club career ==
Niya, began his senior career with Victory Sports Club and emerged as one of the club's standout wingers during the late 2000s. Under coach Ali Suzain, Bokury became an important player for Victory during the 2007 season and remained with the club for four seasons.

After leaving Victory in 2011, Niyaz signed for Maziya, where he spent two seasons. He later joined rivals New Radiant Sports Club and was part of the squad that achieved a perfect domestic season, winning all competitions in 2013.

Following his spell with New Radiant, he represented his hometown club Mahibadhoo Sports Club in the Maldives First Division. After one season with Mahibadhoo, he returned to Maziya and spent another three-year spell with the club, before stepping back from competitive football in 2017 due to an injury.

After spending nearly three years away from football, Niyaz returned in 2020 with Club Valencia, then competing in the Second Division. He played an important role in helping the club gain promotion to the First Division as one of the squad's experienced players. He later featured for Valencia during the 2020–21 Dhivehi Premier League season before appearing for JJ Sports Club in the 2022 Maldives Second Division Football Tournament.

In 2023, Victory announced the return of Niyaz ahead of the Maldives Second Division Football Tournament, bringing back the experienced winger to strengthen the squad.

Niyaz helped his boyhood club rise again to the top flight by securing them a place in the 2023–24 Maldivian Second Division Football Tournament Final. He scored in the final but Mas Odi SC went on to win the game 3–2. In his return to Dhivehi Premier League after 5 seasons, he scored a bicycle kick goal in a 3–2 loss, against Odi Sports Club which won the Best Goal of the Season at the 2026 FAM Awards.

== International career ==
Niyaz made his international debut for the Maldives national football team on 12 October 2010 in a friendly match against Singapore national football team. He came on as a 69th-minute substitute for Mukhthar Naseer in a 3–0 defeat.

He scored his first international goal on 13 May 2014 in a 7–1 friendly victory against Laos national football team.

On 6 September 2016, Niyaz scored against Laos in a 4–0 victory during the 2019 AFC Asian Cup qualification.

== International goals ==
Scores and results list the Maldives goal tally first.

#	Date	Venue	Opponent	Score	Result	Competition
1.	13 May 2014	National Football Stadium, Malé	Laos	2–1	7–1	Friendly
1.	13 May 2014	National Football Stadium, Malé	Laos	3–0	4–0	2019 AFC Asian Cup qualification

== Honors ==
Victory

- Dhivehi League: 2007
- FA Cup: 2009, 2010
- President's Cup: 2009

Maziya

- Dhivehi Premier League: 2016
- Malé League: 2017
- FA Cup: 2009, 2012
- President's Cup: 2015
- Charity Shierld: 2015, 2016, 2017

New Radiant

- Dhivehi League: 2013
- FA Cup: 2013
- President's Cup: 2013
- Charity Shierld: 2013

Valencia

- Second Division: 2020

Individual

- FAM Awards Goal of the Season: 2026
