= Ahmed Aiham =

Maldivian footballer

Personal information
- Full name: Ahmed Aiham
- Date of birth: 5 July 2002 (age 24)
- Place of birth: HA. Utheemu, Maldives
- Position: Midfielder

Team information
- Current team: Maziya
- Number: 10

Youth career
- 2018–2019: VIHS
- 2022: Super United Sports

Senior career*
Years	Team	Apps	(Gls)
2022–2024	Super United Sports		
2024–	Maziya	18	(5)

International career^{‡}
2023–	Maldives	17	(0)
- * Club domestic league appearances and goals as of 6 February 2026 ‡ National team caps and goals as of 1 October 2026

Ahmed Aiham (Dhivehi: އަޙްމަދު އައިހަމް; born 5 July 2002) nicknamed Fatho, is a Maldivian footballer who plays as a midfielder for Maziya and Maldives national team.

== Club career ==
=== Early life and youth career ===
Aiham was born in HA. Utheemu, Maldives. He began his football career during his high school years at Villa International High School. School football was they feeder stage to youth national teams, but he lost the chance when he had to travel abroad with Under 19 Inter School Tournament was just about to start in 2019.

After school, he got the chance to join Super United Sports through coach Fareed Mohamed. Fareed was his coach during his time at Villa International High School. Aiham caught the attention from their senior team head-coach Ismail Mahfooz and was innediately registered as a senior player.

=== Super United Sports ===
Aiham was mostly a substitute during his first season making Dhivehi Premier League debut at the age of 19. On 2 June 2022, he scored his first goal for the club, taking the lead for them against Club Valencia in the 3–1 loss in 2022 Dhivehi Premier League. Super United had to play in the relegation play-off that season, Aiham played a vital role in the play-off helping them to secure a Premier League spot for the next season. He became a regular starter next season, scoring important goals during their run finishing third in the league table.

=== Maziya ===
On 29 August 2024, Aiham signed with Maziya. He made his debut for the club on 26 October 2024, during their 2–1 loss to FK Arkadag in the 2024–25 AFC Challenge League group stage at the Al Kuwait Sports Club Stadium.

On 15 September 2025, Aiham won the 2025 Maldivian FA Charity Shield for Maziya, scoring the opener in the 2–0 win against Club Eagles. He was also awarded the man of the match. He scored his first league goal for Maziya on 31 October 2025 in their 5–0 win against Club Valencia. He scored a total of five goals during their 2025–26 Dhivehi Premier League winning campaign.

Aiham scored a brace against New Radiant in the 2026 President's Cup semi-final on 20 February 2026, where they drew 2–2 in regular time, and won 4–3 on penalties with him converting his spot kick. Maziya was defeated in the final by Odi Sports Club where Aiham missed his spot kick in the penalty shootout.

On 3 August 2026, Aiham scored the winner for Maziya in their 2–1 win against Odi Sports Club in 2026 Maldives Cup Winners' Cup. He also scored against New Radiant in the final played on 19 August 2026, where Maziya won the cup on penalties.

At the 2026 FAM Awards on 8 October 2026, he added the Maldives' Best Player Award to is personal tally.

== International career ==
Aiham received his first call-up to the Maldives national team on 17 May 2023 by the Italian Francesco Moriero placing him in the 40 player preliminary squad for the 2023 SAFF Championship. He was included in the final 23 men squad for the tournament, but was an unused substitute throughout.

On 17 October 2023, Aiham made his debut for the Maldives in the 2026 FIFA World Cup qualification 2–1 loss to Bangladesh at the Bashundhara Kings Arena. He came in as an 80th minute substitute for Hussain Nihan.

On 10 November 2025, Aiham was dropped from the national team by coach Mohamed Siyaz for missing the practice and being involved in a futsal tournament with Utheemu. He later apologized for his misconduct, taking full personal responsibility. He was again called up to the national team by coach István Urbányi in March 2026.

== Honours ==
Maziya

- Dhivehi Premier League: 2025–26
- Charity Shield: 2025, 2026
- Cup Winners' Cup: 2026

Maldives

- South Asian Super Cup: 2025

Individual

- FAM Awards Best Player: 2026
