= Ahmed Maish Rasheed =

Maldivian footballer (born 2004)

Maai
- Maai with TC Sports in 2025

Personal information
- Full name: Ahmed Maish Rasheed
- Date of birth: 11 July 2004 (age 22)
- Place of birth: Malé, Maldives
- Positions: Wing-back; winger

Team information
- Current team: Victory Sports Club
- Number: 19

Youth career
- TC Sports Club

Senior career*
Years	Team	Apps	(Gls)
2021–2026	TC Sports Club		
2026–	Victory Sports Club		

International career^{‡}
2022	Maldives U20	8	(0)
2022–	Maldives	4	(0)
- * Club domestic league appearances and goals as of 6 August 2026 ‡ National team caps and goals as of 1 October 2026

Ahmed Maish Rasheed (Dhivehi: އަހުމަދު މާއިޝް ރަޝީދު; /ˈɑːmɛd ˈmɑːɪʃ rəˈʃiːd/; born 11 July 2004) commonly known as Maai (Dhivehi: މާއި), is a Maldivian footballer who plays as a wing-back or winger for Victory Sports Club and the Maldives national team.

== Club career ==
At the age of 16, Maai began his senior career in 2021 with TC Sports Club. He made his Dhivehi Premier League debut in 2020–21 season.

On 18 December 2025, Maai scored against Maziya to draw 1–1 at stoppage time which ended Maziya's 100 percent winning run in 2025–26 Dhivehi Premier League. After the season, he left TC Sports Club on 6 August 2026.

Maai joined Victory Sports Club on 13 August 2026.

== International career ==
Maai represented the Maldives at the 2022 SAFF U-20 Championship and 2023 AFC U-20 Asian Cup qualification.

On 17 December 2022, Maai made his Maldives national team debut against Singapore in the 3–1 loss at the Jalan Besar Stadium. He came in as an 87th minute substitution for Hassain Shifaz.

== Honours ==
TC Sports Club

- Maldives FA Cup runner-up: 2026
