= 2025–26 Dhivehi Premier League =

Dhivehi Premier League
- Season: 2025–26
- Dates: 18 September 2025 – 6 February 2026
- Champions: Maziya S&RC (6th title)
- Relegated: United Victory; Valencia; Green Streets
- AFC Challenge League: Maziya S&RC
- Club Championship: Maziya S&RC
- Matches: 180
- Goals: 285 (1.58 per match)
- Top goalscorer: (Spain) Sergio Mendigutxia (12 Goals)
- Biggest home win: Maziya S&RC 9-0 Club Green Streets (25 October 2025); Buru SC 9-0 United Victory (12 December 2025)
- Biggest away win: Club Valencia 1-7 Odi Sports Club (26 September 2025); TC Sports Club 0-6 New Radiant S.C. (19 September 2025)
- Highest scoring: New Radiant S.C. 8-4 Club Eagles (22 January 2026)
- Longest winning run: 10; Maziya S&RC
- Longest unbeaten run: 18; Maziya S&RC
- Longest winless run: 9 United Victory

The 2025–26 Dhivehi Premier League was the ninth season of the Premier League, the top Maldivian professional league for association football clubs since its establishment in 2015.

== Teams ==
A total of 10 teams are participating in the league. Seven teams competed in the 2023 Dhivehi Premier League, while Odi Sports Club and Victory Sports Club were promoted from the 2023–24 Maldivian Second Division Football Tournament.

New Radiant, who finished third among the relevant teams in the previous second division competition, were subsequently admitted to the Premier League following the withdrawal of Super United Sports from the competition due to financial difficulties. Super United Sports were subsequently relegated to the Third Division Football Tournament.

=== Changes from the previous season ===
Promoted to the Premier League

Odi Sports Club

Victory Sports Club

New Radiant (Note: New Radiant were admitted to the Premier League following the withdrawal and administrative relegation of SUS.)

Relegated to Second Division

None

Relegated to Third Division

Super United Sports (Note: Super United Sports were administratively relegated following their withdrawal from the Premier League.)

=== Teams and their divisions ===
Note: Clubs are listed in alphabetical order.

Team	Division	Stadium	Capacity
Buru Sports Club	Machchangolhi	National Football Stadium	4,000
Club Eagles	Maafannu	National Football Stadium	4,000
Club Green Streets	Machchangolhi	National Football Stadium	4,000
Club Valencia	Machchangolhi	National Football Stadium	4,000
Maziya S&RC	Maafannu	National Football Stadium	4,000
New Radiant S.C.	Henveiru	National Football Stadium	4,000
Odi Sports Club	Galolhu	National Football Stadium	4,000
T.C. Sports Club	Henveiru	National Football Stadium	4,000
United Victory	Galolhu	National Football Stadium	4,000
Victory Sports Club	Galolhu	National Football Stadium	4,000

=== Personnel and kits ===
Team	Head coach	Captain	Kit manufacturer	Main sponsor	Other sponsors
Buru Sports Club	(Maldives) Mohamed Nizam	(Maldives) Ali Hamdhaan	Jozti	None	None
Club Eagles			Aspire Sports	Timber House	List: Front: Damietta (home) Brine Rooftop (away) Kappi (away) Back: Mendhuru TV (home) Brine Rooftop (home) Kappi (home) Sleeves: Harins Mendhuru TV (away) Shorts: Crowning Fresh Fish
Club Green Streets	(Maldives) Ali Nisthar Mohamed	(Maldives) Rilwan Waheed	Jozti	None	None
Club Valencia	(Maldives) Ahmed Mujuthaba	(Maldives) Ethan Ibrahim Zaki	Island Apparels	None	None
Maziya S&RC	(Spain) Luisma Hernández	(Maldives) Ali Samooh	Island Apparels	Ooredoo Maldives	None
New Radiant S.C.	(Maldives) Ali Suzain	(Maldives) Ali Fasir	Jerzia	Damietta	List: Back: Mendhuru TV Brine Rooftop Kappi Sleeves: Harins
Odi Sports Club	(Spain) Andrés García	(Maldives) Mohamed Rasheed	Obion	WellCo Maldives	List: Back: Obion Vaguthu.mv The Norman
T.C. Sports Club	(Maldives) Ahsan Rasheed (Maldives) Mohamed Athif (co-coaches)	(Maldives) Mohamed Ajufaan	Island Apparels	Damietta	List: Back: Kappi Sleeves: Harins
United Victory	(Maldives) Mohamed Nazeeh	(Maldives) Moosa Azeem Hassan	Inked Maldives	None	None
Victory Sports Club	(Slovakia) Gergely Geri	(Maldives) Hassan Sufianu	Jozti	Damietta	List: Back: Mendhuru TV China Garden Kappi Sleeves: Harins

^{1} Mohamed Faisal was captain of Buru Sports before leaving the club to join New Radiant on 2 December 2025.

=== Coaching changes ===
Team	Outgoing manager	Manner of departure	Date of vacancy	Position in the table	Incoming manager	Date of appointment
Maziya	(Serbia) Dragan Dukanovic	Dismissed	1 November 2024	Pre-season	(Spain) Luisma Hernández	10 January 2025
Victory Sports Club		Mutual consent	31 March 2025	Pre-season		1 September 2025
Odi Sports Club		Mutual consent	5 May 2025	Pre-season		9 March 2025
Club Eagles		Appointed to Maldives national football team	21 August 2025	Pre-season		21 August 2025
New Radiant S.C.		Appointed to Maldives national under-17 football team	21 August 2025	Pre-season		23 August 2025
Victory Sports Club		End of interim spell	25 September 2025	9th		25 September 2025
Club Eagles		Mutual consent	12 October 2025	9th		12 October 2025
T.C. Sports Club		N/A	29 November 2025	8th		29 November 2025

== Foreign players ==
- Player's name in **bold** indicates the player was registered during the mid-season transfer window.

Club	Visa 1	Visa 2	Visa 3	Visa 4	Former Players (Note: Foreign players who left their clubs or were de-registered from playing squad due to medical issues or other matters.)
Club Eagles	(Serbia) **Drago Maksimovic**	(Sierra Leone) Ibrahim Lebbie	(Uzbekistan) Toshpulatov Abdumalik	(Sierra Leone) Marvin Lebbie	(Japan) Katsuyoshi Kimishima
Green Streets	(Egypt) Elsayed Abdelfattah Elsayed Mahmoud	(Uzbekistan) Shukurali Pulatov	(Egypt) Obaida Kadhim	(Nigeria) **Ojo Olorunleke Oluwasegun**	
Valencia	(France) **Stephane Blanc**	(Uruguay) **Guiller Martinez**	(Kyrgyzstan) Davranbek Abduvakhapov	(Egypt) Abdelatty Moussa Basal Mohamed	
Victory Sports Club	(Hungary) **Bence Balazs Farkas**	(Slovakia) **Miloš Lačný**	(Uzbekistan) Javokhir Azamov	(Nepal) **Kiran Kumar Limbu**	(Egypt) Ahmed Mahmoud (Syria) Mahmoud Al Youssef
Maziya	(Portugal) Luis Almeida	(Ghana) Obeng Regan	(Azerbaijan) **Nazim Mammadzada**	(Spain) Sergio Mendigutxia	
TC Sports	(Sri Lanka) Chalana Chameera	(Nigeria) **Ibrahim Oladimeji**	(Nigeria) Daniel Emmanuel	(Ghana) Boadu Prince	
Odi Sports Club	(Hungary) Barnabás Tóth	(Nigeria) **Ganiu Ogungbe**	(Egypt) Islam Fekry	(Guyana) **Keanu Marsh-Brown**	(Lithuania) Karolis Laukžemis (Nepal) Suman Shrestha
United Victory	(Egypt) Mostafa Mahmoud Aly Elshazly	(Egypt) Ali Adel Mustafa Ali	(Guinea) **Lancinet Sidibe**	(Egypt) Mohamed Samir Mohamed Mohamed Mosleh Saad	
New Radiant	(Brazil) Guilherme Silva	(Uzbekistan) Furkaton Khasanboev	(Nigeria) **Alhaji Gero**	(Liberia) **Abdulai Bility**	(Brazil) Nixon Guylherme
Buru Sports Club	(Brazil) Hudson Jesus	(Senegal) **Diawandou Diagne**	(Egypt) Alaaeldin Nasr Elsayed		

== League table ==
Pos	Team	Pld	W	D	L	GF	GA	GD	Pts	Qualification or relegation
1	Maziya (C)	18	15	3	0	53	9	+44	48	Qualification for the AFC Challenge League play-offs and 2027 President's Cup
2	Odi Sports	18	12	3	3	40	12	+28	39	2027 President's Cup
3	New Radiant	18	11	4	3	42	16	+26	37	2027 President's Cup
4	Buru Sports	18	8	5	5	40	25	+15	29	2027 President's Cup
5	Eagles	18	6	5	7	30	33	−3	23	2027 President's Cup play-offs
6	Victory	18	6	3	9	18	31	−13	21	2027 President's Cup play-offs
7	TC Sports (O)	18	6	3	9	18	32	−14	21	Qualification for the 2026–27 Dhivehi Premier League qualifiers and 2027 President's Cup play-offs
8	Green Streets (R)	18	3	3	12	17	43	−26	12	Qualification for the 2026–27 Dhivehi Premier League qualifiers and 2027 President's Cup play-offs
9	Valencia (R)	18	3	3	12	12	40	−28	12	Relegation to 2026–27 FAM Regional Leagues
10	United Victory (R)	18	3	2	13	15	44	−29	11	Relegation to 2026–27 FAM Regional Leagues

Source: Football Association of Maldives
Rules for classification: 1) Points; 2) Head-to-head points; 3) Head-to-head goal difference; 4) Head-to-head goals scored; 5) Goal difference; 6) Goals scored.
(C) Champion; (O) Playoff Winner; (R) Relegated

== Results ==
=== First round ===
==== Week 1 ====
18 September 2025	Maziya	5–1	Eagles	National Football Stadium, Malé
21:00	Naiz 4', 24', 45+3', 63'; Sameeh 29' (o.g.)	Report	29' Mahudhee	Referee: Rauf Raeef

19 September 2025	TC Sports	0–6	New Radiant	National Football Stadium, Malé
16:00		Report	23' Irufaan; 39', 47' Fasir; 43' (pen.) Guilherme Silva; 73' Azoomu; 86' Raif	Referee: Mohamed Javiz

19 September 2025	Buru Sports	5–0	Victory	National Football Stadium, Malé
21:00	Junaid 8'; Hudson 25', 74'; Naim 90+2'; Azhad 90+3'	Report		Referee: Hussain Sinan

20 September 2025	United Victory	0–4	Odi Sports	National Football Stadium, Malé
16:00		Report	28' Looth; 52' Ibrahim; 76' Ahzam; 89' Muzdhan	Referee: Abdulla Shathir

20 September 2025	Green Streets	1–2	Valencia	National Football Stadium, Malé
21:00	Obaida 90+6'	Report	13' Ethan; 66' Buba Sylla

==== Week 2 ====
24 September 2025	Eagles	2–2	Buru Sports	National Football Stadium, Malé
16:00	Mahudhee 6', 20'	Report	38' Naim; 58' (pen.) Junaid

24 September 2025	Maziya	3–0	TC Sports	National Football Stadium, Malé
21:00	Mendigutxia 8'; Nazeem 43'; Ilan 87'	Report		Referee: Bayanjankar Kabin (ANFA)

25 September 2025	Green Streets	0–1	Victory	National Football Stadium, Malé
16:00		Report	90+2' Midhuhath	Referee: Umesh Bidari (ANFA)

25 September 2025	United Victory	0–2	New Radiant	National Football Stadium, Malé
21:00		Report	67' Fasir; 90+1' Guilherme Silva	Referee: Hussain Sinan

26 September 2025	Valencia	1–7	Odi Sports	National Football Stadium, Malé
16:00	Sameeu 83'	Report	11', 57', 64' Laukžemis; 13' Looth; 21' Ibrahim; 30' Imran; 90+3' Muzdhan	Referee: Prajwol Chhetri (ANFA)

==== Week 3 ====
30 September 2025	TC Sports	1–4	United Victory	National Football Stadium, Malé
16:00	A. Rilwan 45'	Report	48', 52', 58' Suhadh; 84' Ish Aafu	Referee: Ismail Mohamed

30 September 2025	Maziya	3–0	Buru Sports	National Football Stadium, Malé
21:00	Hamza 33'; Naiz 41'; Aisam 59'	Report		Referee: Bayanjankar Kabin (ANFA)

1 October 2025	Valencia	0–2	New Radiant	National Football Stadium, Malé
16:00		Report	60', 83' (pen.) Fasir	Referee: Hussain Sinan

1 October 2025	Eagles	2–3	Green Streets	National Football Stadium, Malé
21:00	Kimishima 34'; Rizuvan 84'	Report	11', 90+3' Obaida; 31' Rilwan	Referee: Adam Fazeel

2 October 2025	Odi Sports	3–2	Victory	National Football Stadium, Malé
21:00	Laukžemis 45+1' (pen.), 78'; Ahzam 86'	Report	72' Nashaah; 88' Niyaz	Referee: Ismail Mohamed

===== Week 4 =====
19 October 2025	Buru Sports	2–1	Green Streets	National Football Stadium, Malé
16:00	Naim 45+5'; Junaid 72'	Report	90+7' Obaida	Referee: Mohamed Javiz

19 October 2025	Maziya	4–1	United Victory	National Football Stadium, Malé
21:00	Mendigutxia 6', 87'; Hamza 35'; Almeida 90+1'	Report	43' El Shazly	Referee: Husain Sinan

20 October 2025	Eagles	0–0	Odi Sports	National Football Stadium, Malé
16:00		Report		Referee: Abdulla Shathir

20 October 2025	TC Sports	3–1	Valencia	National Football Stadium, Malé
21:00	Izan 5'; Ahnaf 11'; Boadu 90+5'	Report	Buba Sylla 90'	Referee: Ismail Mohamed

21 October 2025	Victory	0–4	New Radiant	National Football Stadium, Malé
16:00		Report	8', 13', 61' Ali Fasir; 79' Husaam	Attendance: 500; Referee: Raeef Rauf

==== Week 5 ====
25 October 2025	Maziya	9–0	Green Streets	National Football Stadium, Malé
16:00	Mendigutxia 19', 36', 56'; Hamza 24'; Naiz 31'; Almeida 42'; Aisam 53'; Ilan 59', 83'	Report

25 October 2025	United Victory	0–0	Valencia	National Football Stadium, Malé
21:00		Report

26 October 2025	Buru Sports	1–2	Odi Sports	National Football Stadium, Malé
16:00	Naim 36'	Report	48' Looth; 90' Muzdhan

26 October 2025	TC Sports	0–1	Victory	National Football Stadium, Malé
21:00		Report	Nasooh 5'

27 October 2025	Eagles	0–0	New Radiant	National Football Stadium, Malé
21:00		Report

==== Week 6 ====
31 October 2025	Maziya	5–0	Valencia	National Football Stadium, Malé
16:00	Ilan 17', 48'; Mendigutxia 55', 90+6'; Aiham II 58'	Report

31 October 2025	Green Streets	0–4	Odi Sports	National Football Stadium, Malé
21:00		Report	Ibrahim 4'; Ahzam 7'; Muzdhan 40'; Aiham I 48'

1 November 2025	United Victory	0–1	Victory	National Football Stadium, Malé
16:00		Report	Everton 73'

1 November 2025	Buru Sports	1–2	New Radiant	National Football Stadium, Malé
21:00	Ishfaaq 35'	Report	Yaamin 21'; Raif 67'

2 November 2025	Eagles	2–0	TC Sports	National Football Stadium, Malé
16:00	Easa 64'; Kimishima 76'	Report

==== Week 7 ====
7 November 2025	Valencia	1–0	Victory	National Football Stadium, Malé
16:00	Athwan 79'	Report

7 November 2025	Maziya	1–0	Odi Sports	National Football Stadium, Malé
21:00	Hamza 90+7'	Report

8 November 2025	Green Streets	2–2	New Radiant	National Football Stadium, Malé
16:00	El Sayed 55'; Pulatov 88'	Report	Raif 10'; Guilherme Silva 22'

8 November 2025	Eagles	3–1	United Victory	National Football Stadium, Malé
21:00	Mahudhee 25'; Lebbie 36'; Sidhaam 43'	Report	Ish'aaf 68'

9 November 2025	TC	1–1	Buru	National Football Stadium, Malé
21:00	Dhaanish 90+2'	Report	Hudson 74'

==== Week 8 ====
22 November 2025	Maziya	3–0	Victory	National Football Stadium, Malé
16:00	Mendigutxia 37'; Aiham II 84'; Haisham 90+2'	Report

22 November 2025	Odi Sports	1–0	New Radiant	National Football Stadium, Malé
21:00	Ibrahim 66'	Report

23 November 2025	Eagles	3–0	Valencia	National Football Stadium, Malé
16:00	Mahudhee 56'; Rizuvan 65'; Laith 80'	Report

23 November 2025	TC	2–2	Green Streets	National Football Stadium, Malé
21:00	Boadu 18'; Dhaanish 50'	Report	Saagib 9'; Rilwan 45'

24 November 2025	Buru	2–0	United Victory	National Football Stadium, Malé
16:00	Areen 35'; Hudson 90+2'	Report

==== Week 9 ====
28 November 2025	Maziya	2–1	New Radiant	National Football Stadium, Malé
16:00	Aiham II 45+5'; Hamza 73'	Report	Guilherme Silva 10'

28 November 2025	Eagles	2–2	Victory	National Football Stadium, Malé
21:00	Rizuvan 24', 63'	Report	Everton 8'; Ahmed Ali 16'

29 November 2025	TC	0–3	Odi Sports	National Football Stadium, Malé
16:00		Report	Laukžemis 13'; Muzdhan 37'; Ahzam 62'

29 November 2025	Buru	4–1	Valencia	National Football Stadium, Malé
21:00	Naim 43', 66', 77'; Hamdhaan 69'	Report	Athwan 9'

30 November 2025	United Victory	3–1	Green Streets	National Football Stadium, Malé
16:00	Muslim 18'; Musthafa 64'; Shiyaan 78'	Report	Rilwan 84'

=== Second round ===
==== Week 10 ====
11 December 2025	Green Streets	1–2	Maziya	National Football Stadium, Malé
16:00	Rilwan 45+2'	Report	Mendigutxia 68', 90+3'

11 December 2025	Odi Sports	3–0	TC Sports	National Football Stadium, Malé
21:00	Muzdhan 17', 90+2'; Waheed 43'	Report

12 December 2025	New Radiant	3–1	Valencia	National Football Stadium, Malé
16:00	Guilherme Silva 43'; M. Fasir 50'; Raif 74'	Report	Aidh 58'

12 December 2025	Buru	9–0	United Victory	National Football Stadium, Malé
21:00	Diawandou 6', 12'; Hudson 9', 31', 47', 64'; Naim 15'; Areen 25'; Abdulla 44'	Report

13 December 2025	Eagles	0–2	Victory	National Football Stadium, Malé
16:00		Report	Miloš Lačný 34'; Shafraz 90+6'

==== Week 11 ====
18 December 2025	Maziya	1–1	TC Sports	National Football Stadium, Malé
16:00	Naiz 57'	Report	Maish 90+5'

18 December 2025	Valencia	0–1	Green Streets	National Football Stadium, Malé
21:00		Report	El Sayed Mahmoud 10'

19 December 2025	Odi Sports	5–1	United Victory	National Football Stadium, Malé
16:00	Samhan 26' (o.g.); Karolis 35' (pen.), 48'; Muzdhan 57'; Aiham I 61'	Report	Musthafa 73'

19 December 2025	New Radiant	1–3	Victory	National Football Stadium, Malé
21:00	Guilherme Silva 4'	Report	Lačný 29', 57'; Azamov 87'

20 December 2025	Buru	3–2	Eagles	National Football Stadium, Malé
16:00	Naim 83', 90+1'; Usaama 86'	Report	Mahudhee 50'; Shamweel 90+5'

==== Week 12 ====
25 December 2025	United Victory	1–3	TC Sports	National Football Stadium, Malé
16:00	Samir 87'	Report	Prince 40', 60'; Shareef 75'

25 December 2025	Maziya	3–0	Valencia	National Football Stadium, Malé
21:00	Nazeem 21'; Hamza 32', 80'	Report

26 December 2025	Victory	4–1	Green Streets	National Football Stadium, Malé
16:00	Lačný 16', 45+2'; Shamis 25'; Midhuhath 49'	Report	Rilwan 77'

26 December 2025	Odi Sports	0–2	Eagles	National Football Stadium, Malé
21:00		Report	Zain 31'; Lebe 66'

27 December 2025	New Radiant	3–0	Buru	National Football Stadium, Malé
21:00	Raif 26'; Fasir 52', 59'	Report

==== Week 13 ====
4 January 2026	Maziya	2–1	United Victory	National Football Stadium, Malé
16:00	Hamza 30'; Naiz 82'	Report	Mohamed Samir 90+5'

4 January 2026	Victory	1–1	Valencia	National Football Stadium, Malé
21:00	Safraz 90+4'	Report	Stephane Blanc 58'

5 January 2026	Eagles	2–0	TC Sports	National Football Stadium, Malé
16:00	Lebbie 42'; Zain 45'	Report

5 January 2026	Buru	3–1	Green Streets	National Football Stadium, Malé
21:00	Hudson 36'; Naim 52'; Yaameen 85'	Report	Elsayed 90+6'

6 January 2026	Odi Sports	0–0	New Radiant	National Football Stadium, Malé
16:00		Report

==== Week 14 ====
10 January 2026	Maziya	3–0	Victory	National Football Stadium, Malé
16:00	Aiham II 35'; Hamza 62'; Ilan 67'	Report

10 January 2026	Eagles	4–1	United Victory	National Football Stadium, Malé
21:00	Zain 31', 64'; Sabaah 41'; Mahudhee 89'	Report	Mohamed Samir 59'

11 January 2026	Buru	4–1	Valencia	National Football Stadium, Malé
16:00	Naim 30'; Diawandou Diagne 37', 61'; Yaameen 74'	Report	Nawaz 27'

11 January 2026	New Radiant	2–0	TC Sports	National Football Stadium, Malé
21:00	Gero 90+7', 90+8'	Report

12 January 2026	Odi Sports	2–1	Green Streets	National Football Stadium, Malé
21:00	Aiham I 63'; Samir 90'	Report	Elsayed 45+3'

==== Week 15 ====
16 January 2026	Buru	1–1	Victory	National Football Stadium, Malé
16:00	Yaameen 88'	Report	Lačný 44'

16 January 2026	Maziya	3–0	Eagles	National Football Stadium, Malé
21:00	Samooh 55'; Aiham II 78'; Hamza 85'	Report

17 January 2026	Odi Sports	2–1	Valencia	National Football Stadium, Malé
16:00	Ayaaz 38'; Ganiu 90+6'	Report	Aidh 81'

17 January 2026	New Radiant	2–0	United Victory	National Football Stadium, Malé
21:00	Nizam 36'; Gero 64'	Report

18 January 2026	TC Sports	2–0	Green Streets	National Football Stadium, Malé
16:00	Shareef 59'; Dhaanish 73'	Report

==== Week 16 ====
22 January 2026	New Radiant	8–4	Eagles	National Football Stadium, Malé
16:00	Bility 6', 14'; Fasir 34', 78'; Gero 45+1'; Guilherme Silva 57'; Ashfaq 77', 89'	Report	Lebbie 10'; Sidhaam 45+2'; Mahudhee 65'

22 January 2026	Maziya	1–1	Buru	National Football Stadium, Malé
21:00	Naiz 12'	Report	Hudson 35'

23 January 2026	United Victory	0–1	Green Streets	National Football Stadium, Malé
16:00		Report	Ansar 23'

23 January 2026	Odi Sports	3–0	Victory	National Football Stadium, Malé
21:00	Keanu 13'; Looth 19'; Muzdhan 45'	Report

24 January 2026	Valencia	0–1	TC Sports	National Football Stadium, Malé
21:00		Report	Boadu 90+8'

==== Week 17 ====
28 January 2026	Odi Sports	1–1	Buru	National Football Stadium, Malé
16:00	Keanu 56'	Report	Shamveel 7'

28 January 2026	Maziya	2–2	New Radiant	National Football Stadium, Malé
21:00	Nazeem 46'; Samooh 55'	Report	Gero 58'; Ashfaq 90+11'

29 January 2026	Victory	0–1	TC Sports	National Football Stadium, Malé
16:00		Report	Prince 69'

29 January 2026	Eagles	1–1	Green Streets	National Football Stadium, Malé
21:00	Hisam 90+7'	Report	Pulatov 90'

30 January 2026	United Victory	0–0	Valencia	National Football Stadium, Malé
16:00		Report

==== Week 18 ====
4 February 2026	Eagles	0–2	Valencia	National Football Stadium, Malé
16:00		Report	Aidh 45+2'; Martinez 49'

4 February 2026	Victory	0–2	United Victory	National Football Stadium, Malé
21:00		Report	Mostafa 83', 87'

5 February 2026	New Radiant	2–0 (awarded)	Green Streets	National Football Stadium, Malé
16:00		Report
Note: Match forfeited as Green Streets DNS.

5 February 2026	Buru	0–3	TC Sports	National Football Stadium, Malé
21:00		Report	Chameera 29'; Shareef 31'; Ahnaf 67'

6 February 2026	Maziya	1–0	Odi Sports	National Football Stadium, Malé
21:00	Mendigutxia 14'	Report

== Season statistics ==
As of 20 December 2025

=== Top scorers ===
Rank	Player	Club	Goals
1	(Maldives) Mohamed Naim	Buru Sports	12
1	(Maldives) Ali Fasir	New Radiant	12
1	(Spain) Sergio Mendigutxia	Maziya	12
4	(Maldives) Hamza Mohamed	Maziya	10
4	(Brazil) Hudson Jesus	Buru Sports	10
6	(Lithuania) Karolis Laukžemis	Odi Sports	8
6	(Maldives) Ibrahim Mahudhee Hussain	Eagles	8
6	(Maldives) Naiz Hassan	Maziya	8
9	(Maldives) Muzdhan Hassan	Odi Sports	7

==== Hat-tricks ====
Player	For	Against	Result	Date	Ref.
(Maldives) Naiz Hassan^{4}	Maziya	Eagles	5–1	18 September 2025	
(Lithuania) Karolis Laukžemis	Odi Sports	Valencia	7–1	26 September 2025	
(Maldives) Hussain Suhadh Suhan	United Victory	TC Sports	4–1	30 September 2025	
(Maldives) Ali Fasir	New Radiant	Victory	4–0	21 October 2025	
(Spain) Sergio Mendigutxia	Maziya	Green Streets	9–0	25 October 2025	
(Maldives) Mohamed Naim	Buru	Valencia	4–1	29 November 2025	
(Brazil) Hudson Jesus^{4}	Buru	United Victory	9–0	12 December 2025	

Notes

- ^{4} – player scored 4 goals

=== Clean sheets ===
Rank	Player	Club	Clean sheets
1	(Maldives) Mohamed Shafeeu	Odi Sports	7
2	(Pakistan) Saqib Hanif	New Radiant	5
2	(Maldives) Hussain Shareef	Maziya	5
3	(Maldives) Mohamed Ashwaan	Eagles	4
4	(Maldives) Mohamed Yaameen	Victory	2
5	(Maldives) Mohamed Faisal	Buru Sports	1
5	(Maldives) Iyaan Abdul Aleem	Maziya	1

== Relegation controversy ==
On the final day of the season, Green Streets failed to fulfill their fixture against New Radiant, resulting in a 2–0 forfeit loss. The result allowed Green Streets to avoid relegation on goal difference, as a loss by four or more goals would have seen them drop below Club Valencia into the relegation zone. Following the match, Valencia accused Green Streets of match-fixing and petitioned the Football Association of Maldives, Asian Football Confederation, and FIFA. FAM subsequently fined Green Streets 50,000 rufiyaa and imposed a transfer ban, though the result was upheld. Green Streets denied the allegations, stating the no-show was caused by a viral outbreak of flu and diarrhea within the squad.

== 2026–27 Dhivehi Premier League qualifiers ==
Qualifiers featured six teams. Top four teams qualify to the 2026–27 Dhivehi Premier League.

- TC Sports Club (7th place in the 2025–26 Dhivehi Premier League)
- Club Green Streets (8th place in the 2025–26 Dhivehi Premier League)
- Dhidhdhoo Sports (North Regional League Champions)
- Huraa Community Club (Central Regional League Champions)
- Gadhdhoo Recreation Club (South Regional League Champions)
- Biss Buru Sports Club (Malé Regional League Champions)

Pos	Team	Pld	W	D	L	GF	GA	GD	Pts	Qualification or relegation
1	Biss Buru (P)	5	4	1	0	14	3	+11	13	Promotion to 2026–27 Dhivehi Premier League
2	TC Sports	5	3	1	1	10	5	+5	10	Promotion to 2026–27 Dhivehi Premier League
3	Dhidhdhoo (P)	5	2	2	1	8	6	+2	8	Promotion to 2026–27 Dhivehi Premier League
4	Gadhdhoo (P)	5	2	0	3	7	9	−2	6	Promotion to 2026–27 Dhivehi Premier League
5	Green Streets (R)	5	1	1	3	5	11	−6	4	Relegation to 2026–27 FAM Regional Leagues
6	Huraa	5	0	1	4	3	13	−10	1	Relegation to 2026–27 FAM Regional Leagues

Rules for classification: 1) Points; 2) Goal difference; 3) Goals scored.
