= Mohamed Ilan Imran =

Maldivian footballer (born 2009)

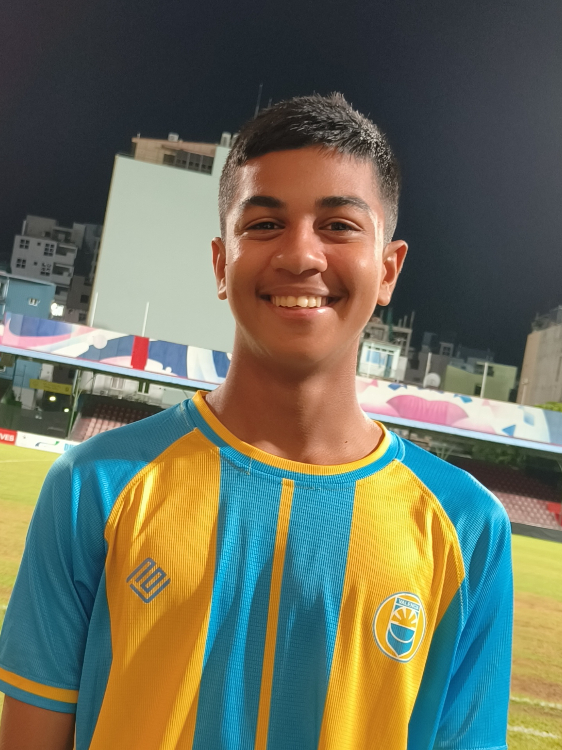
- Ilan with Valencia in 2023

Personal information
- Full name: Mohamed Ilan Imran
- Date of birth: 17 January 2009 (age 17)
- Place of birth: Malé, Maldives
- Position: Striker

Team information
- Current team: Maziya
- Number: 19

Youth career
- 2016–2017: ETFA
- 2017–2018: New Radiant
- 2019–2023: Iskandhar School
- 2018–2021: TC Sports Club
- 2022–2023: Club Valencia
- 2024–: Maziya

Senior career*
Years	Team	Apps	(Gls)
2023	Valencia	7	(1)
2024–	Maziya	6	(5)

International career^{‡}
2023	Maldives U16	3	(1)
2024	Maldives U17	5	(3)
2026–	Maldives U20	3	(3)
2025–	Maldives	6	(0)
- * Club domestic league appearances and goals as of 7 November 2025 ‡ National team caps and goals as of 4 June 2026

Mohamed Ilan Imran (Dhivehi: މުޙައްމަދު އިލާން އިމްރާން; born 17 January 2009) is a Maldivian professional footballer who plays as a striker for Dhivehi Premier League club Maziya and Maldives national team.

== Early life and youth career ==
Ilan began playing football at the age of seven, with Early Touch Football Academy, before moving through the youth setups of New Radiant, TC Sports Club and Club Valencia. He rose to prominence in the 2022 FAM U14 Youth League, scoring 35 goals in eight matches for Valencia and leading the club to the title. In 2023, he continued his rise by scoring 38 goals in just five matches for Iskandhar School, winning the U15 Inter School Championship.

== Club career ==
=== Valencia ===
In 2023, Ilan was promoted to the Valencia senior squad, which was recognized as the youngest side in the Dhivehi Premier League era.

At the age of 14 years, 2 months and 29 days, he made his senior debut when he started in the 2023 President’s Cup match against Super United Sports, which ended in a 5–0 defeat.

He made his Dhivehi Premier League debut on 8 May 2023 against TC Sports Club, a match Valencia lost 2–0, but became the youngest player ever to start in a league match.

Ilan was an unused substitute in Valencia’s second league game against Club Eagles on 14 May 2023, as he competed in the Inter School Athletics Championship that morning, where he won gold medals in the 100m, 200m and long jump events, was named Best U15 Male Athlete, and also set a new 100m meet record. It was the only game he missed that season.

On 24 August 2023, Ilan became the youngest goal scorer in Dhivehi Premier League history when he scored in a 2–2 draw against Club Green Streets at the age of 14 years, 7 months and 7 days. Before scoring the first goal, on 8 August 2023, Ilan became the youngest player to assist a goal in the Premier League, at the age of 14 years, 6 months and 22 days, helping Ethan Ibrahim Zaki score against United Victory where they were defeated 2–1.

After the 2023 season, Ilan trialed with Al Ain FC Academy in the United Arab Emirates. He eventually chose to remain in the Maldives to complete his O‑Level studies, spending the remainder of the year training with Maziya.

=== Maziya ===
On 1 September 2024, Ilan signed with Maziya at the age of 15. The following year, he played a key role in helping the club win the FAM U19 Championship, their first youth title in 14 years. He scored twice in the final and finished as the tournament’s top scorer with nine goals, earning the Golden Boot.

In May 2025, Ilan made his senior debut for Maziya in the FAM League Cup, a competition organized by the FAM Normalization Committee in consultation with FIFA, after delays to the start of the new Maldivian domestic club season. On 5 May, he came on as a substitute in the 70th minute against New Radiant and scored in the 83rd, as Maziya won 5–1. Four days later, he scored the opener against TC Sports Club in a 2–0 win, once again coming off the bench at half-time. At the age of 16, Ilan finished the tournament as the top scorer with four goals, including a brace in the final against Odi SC. All of his goals in the tournament were scored as a substitute.

On 12 August 2025, Ilan made his official debut for Maziya, in the 2025–26 AFC Challenge League Qualifying play-off, coming on as a half-time substitute for Miljan Škrbić in a 4–0 defeat to Al-Arabi of Kuwait at the National Football Stadium in Malé.

On 16 September 2025, Ilan made his first appearance in a Maldivian FA Charity Shield match, coming in as a 63rd-minute substitute for Hassan Nazeem where Maziya won 2–0. He played his first Dhivehi Premier League match for Maziya on 24 September 2025, also coming in as a second-half substitute for Hassan Nazeem, and scored their third goal which was assisted by Nassah Ibrahim Nasir in the 3–0 win against TC Sports Club.

== International career ==
Ilan represented the Maldives at U16 level before progressing to the U17 team, featuring in the 2024 SAFF U17 Championship and the 2025 AFC U-17 Asian Cup qualification.

In December 2022, at the age of 15, he was invited by Italian coach Francesco Moriero to train with the Maldives senior national team ahead of their preparations for the friendlies against Singapore and Malaysia.

In 2025, he was also included in the Maldives U19 preparations for the 2025 SAFF U-19 Championship, though his O-Level examinations limited his participation. During the same period, he was active for Maziya in the FAM League Cup, only because he does not have to travel outside Malé.

On 26 August 2025, at the age of 16 years and 7 months, Ilan received his first official senior team call-up. He was included in Hussain Shiyaz's preliminary squad ahead of two friendlies against Sri Lanka.

He made his debut on 6 September 2025, coming in as an 89th-minute substitute for Ibrahim Mahudhee in the 3–0 win against Sri Lanka, becoming the youngest debutant at the age of 16 years, 7 months and 20 days, breaking the record of Abdulla Yaameen. He was cautioned in the first minute he came in, but also made an assist to Ali Fasir in the next minute.

== Style of play ==
A versatile forward, Ilan is noted for his pace, finishing ability, and athletic background, often compared to modern attacking forwards who combine sprinting speed with technical skill. He has been compared to Polish striker Robert Lewandowski for his positioning and clinical finishing, and is often referred to by fans as “Ilangoalski”.

== Career statistics ==
=== Club ===
As of match played 7 November 2025

Appearances and goals by club, season and competition
Club	Season	League			FA Cup		President's Cup		Asia		Other		Total	
Club	Season	Division	Apps	Goals	Apps	Goals	Apps	Goals	Apps	Goals	Apps	Goals	Apps	Goals
Valencia	2023	Premier League	7	1	—		2	0	—		—		9	1
Maziya	2025–26	Premier League	6	5	0	0	0	0	1 (Note: Appearances in 2025–26 AFC Challenge League Preliminary stage)	0	7 (Note: One appearance in 2025 Maldivian FA Charity Shield, six appearances and four goals in 2025 FAM League Cup)	4	14	9
Career total			15	6	0	0	2	0	1	0	7	4	23	10

=== International ===
As of match played 14 October 2025

Maldives national team
Year	Apps	Goals
2025	4	0
2026	2	0
Total	6	0

== Honours ==
Club Valencia U14

- FAM Youth League: 2023

Maziya U19

- FAM Youth Championship: 2025

Maziya

- FAM League Cup: 2025
- FAM Charity Shield: 2025
- Dhivehi Premier League: 2025–26

Individual

- 2023 FAM Youth League U14 top scorer
- 2025 FAM Youth Championship U19 top scorer
- 2025 FAM League Cup top scorer
