= Sergio Mendigutxia =

Spanish footballer

Mendi
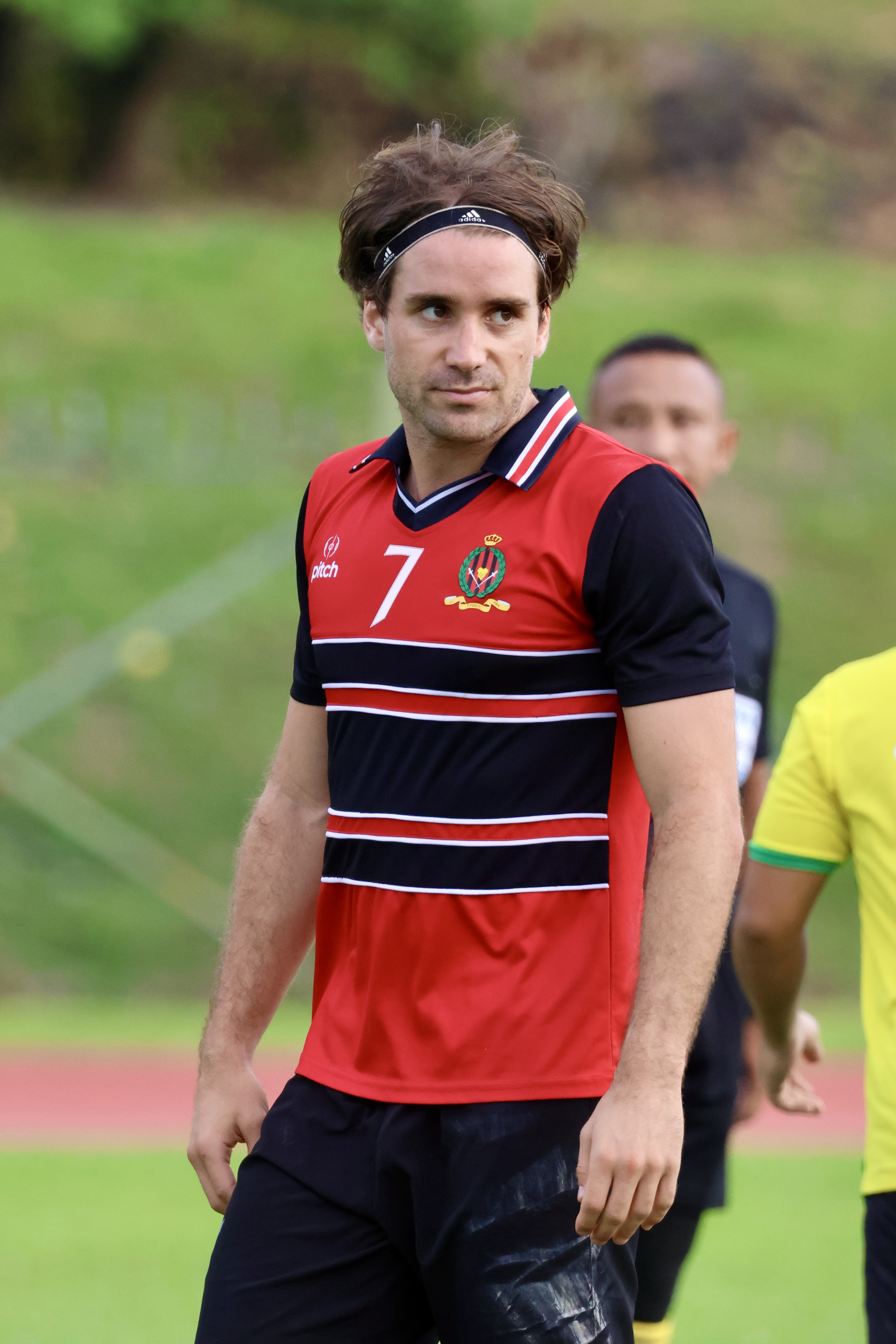
- Mendi with DPMM II in 2025

Personal information
- Full name: Sergio Mendigutxia Iglesias
- Date of birth: 12 June 1993 (age 33)
- Place of birth: Avilés, Spain
- Height: 1.83 m (6 ft 0 in)
- Position: Striker

Youth career
- 1998–1999: El Quirinal
- 1999–2001: Peña Sport
- 2001–2008: Atlético Villalba
- 2008–2009: Collado Villalba
- 2009–2011: Athletic Bilbao

Senior career*
Years	Team	Apps	(Gls)
2008–2009	Collado Villalba	6	(3)
2011	Bilbao Athletic	2	(1)
2011–2012	Basconia	18	(3)
2013	La Roda	5	(0)
2013–2014	Córdoba B	21	(8)
2013–2014	Córdoba	6	(2)
2014–2016	Sporting B	61	(19)
2015	Sporting Gijón	1	(0)
2016–2017	Logroñés	20	(2)
2017–2018	Racing Ferrol	29	(2)
2018	UD Sanse	12	(1)
2018–2019	Stal Mielec	13	(0)
2020–2021	Marino de Luanco	22	(3)
2021–2022	NEROCA	16	(10)
2022	US Mariglianese	5	(1)
2023	Gokulam Kerala	12	(8)
2023	AFC Eskilstuna	9	(0)
2024	Marino de Luanco	6	(1)
2024–2025	DPMM II	13	(34)
2025–2026	Maziya	13	(12)
- * Club domestic league appearances and goals as of 7 May 2026

Sergio Mendigutxia Iglesias (born 12 June 1993), commonly known by his nickname Mendi, is a Spanish professional footballer who plays as a forward.

== Club career ==
=== Europe ===
Born in Avilés, Asturias, Mendi began playing as a senior with local CU Collado Villalba in the 2008–09 season, in the Tercera División. In April 2009 he signed with Athletic Bilbao, returning to youth football. Mendi also appeared with the reserves in the 2010–11 season, in the Segunda División B.

After appearing with Athletic's farm team in the 2011–12 season, Mendi suffered a syncope in early April 2012, being sidelined for the rest of the season. He rescinded his link with the Biscay side on 3 November, after failing to appear in 2012–13.

On 30 January 2013 Mendi signed with La Roda CF, in the third level. In July he signed with Córdoba CF, being initially assigned to the reserves also in the third division.

Mendi made his first-team debut on 30 November 2013, playing the entire second half and scoring his club's only of a 1–2 home loss against FC Barcelona B, in the Segunda División. On 11 July of the following year he joined another reserve team, Sporting de Gijón B.

Mendi made his debut for the Rojiblancos' first team on 26 October 2015, coming on as a second-half substitute for Miguel Ángel Guerrero in a 0–3 La Liga away loss against Athletic Bilbao.

=== India ===
On 29 August 2021, Mendi joined I-League club NEROCA on a season-long deal. On 27 December 2021, he made his debut for the club against Sreenidi Deccan in a 3–2 win, in which he scored a hat-trick. He later played the first half of 2023 for Gokulam Kerala. In July 2023, he signed a contract until the end of the year with Swedish club AFC Eskilstuna.

=== Brunei ===
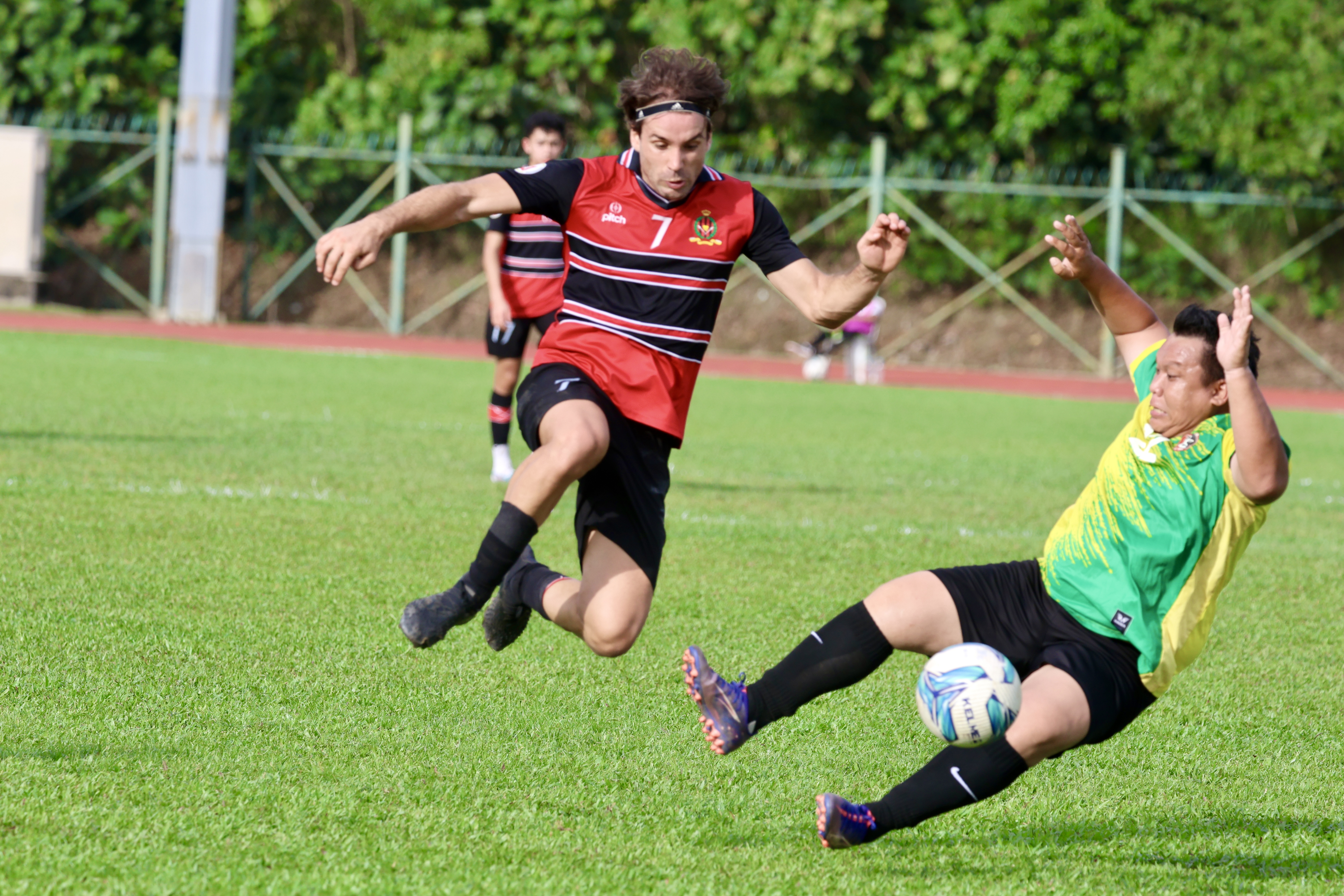
Mendi playing against Jerudong in 2025

In August 2024, after being previously linked to the club, Mendi finally joined the domestic team of DPMM FC, a football club owned by the Crown Prince of Brunei. He made his debut on 1 September 2024 against MS ABDB scoring twice in a 2–1 victory. In the second fixture against AKSE Bersatu on 19 October, Mendi scored five goals in a 6–1 victory. Three days later, he netted a brace at the Hassanal Bolkiah National Stadium against Indera SC which finished 2–0. He continued his hot form by scoring a hat-trick against BSRC FC on the 25th in a 6–1 win. On his fifth game for DPMM II against Lun Bawang FC on 8 November, Mendi scored five goals in a 12–1 rout. On the 24th of the same month, he scored a hat-trick against Wijaya FC.

Mendi managed to score four goals in a 8–0 win against Panchor Murai FC after the league resumed on 11 January 2025, stretching his goalscoring record to 28 for the season. Later that month on the 28th, Mendi scored four goals in the 6–1 victory against Kota Ranger. Heading to the final match to decide the championship winner on 2 February, Mendi was on top of the goalscoring charts with 33 goals but a hat-trick by Willian dos Santos who trailed him by one goal before the game was critical in handing the title to DPMM II's rivals Kasuka FC, while also pipping the golden boot to the Brazilian's favour.

Mendi would eventually gain silverware via the 2025 Brunei FA Cup, beating Indera SC 1–0 in the final on 18 May in which he was a starter.

=== Maldives ===
On 6 September 2025, Mendi joined Dhivehi Premier League side Maziya S&RC on a season-long deal. On his competitive debut at the 2025 Maldivian FA Charity Shield, Mendi gained his first silverware in the island nation after a 2–0 victory. He only took eight minutes to score on his league debut against TC Sports Club on 25 September in a 3–0 win. At the conclusion of the league in February 2026, Maziya were crowned champions with Mendi scoring the decisive goal against Odi Sports Club in their final fixture, ensuring that they were unbeaten all season. He also shared the top scorer accolade with Mohamed Naim and Ali Fasir with 12 goals.

== Honours ==
DPMM II

- Brunei Super League: 2024–25 (runners-up)
- Brunei FA Cup: 2025

Maziya

- Dhivehi Premier League: 2025–26
- Maldivian FA Charity Shield: 2025
