= Chalana Chameera =

Sri Lankan footballer (born 1993)

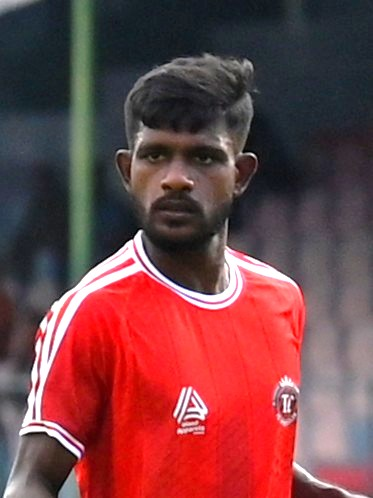
- Chameera with TC Sports in 2025

Personal information
- Date of birth: 10 January 1993 (age 33)
- Place of birth: Sri Lanka
- Height: 1.70 m (5 ft 7 in)
- Positions: Centre-back; defensive midfielder

Team information
- Current team: Colombo FC
- Number: 4

Senior career*
Years	Team	Apps	(Gls)
2012–2015	Saunders SC		
2015–2016	Navy SC		
2016–2019	Colombo FC		
2019–2020	Saunders SC		
2020–2022	Colombo FC		
2022–2023	Blue Star SC		
2023–2024	Tent Sports Club		
2025–2026	TC Sports Club	18	(1)
2026–	Colombo FC	6	(1)

International career^{‡}
2015–	Sri Lanka	37	(0)
- * Club domestic league appearances and goals as of 23 August 2026 ‡ National team caps and goals as of 31 March 2026

Chalana Chameera (born 10 January 1993) is a Sri Lankan professional footballer who plays as a defender and midfielder for Sri Lanka Super League club Colombo FC and the Sri Lanka national team.

== Club career ==
Chameera began his senior career with Saunders SC in 2012. He moved to Navy SC in 2015, before joining Colombo FC in 2016.

He spent three seasons with Colombo FC, competing in domestic competitions and continental qualifiers, before returning to Saunders SC in 2019. In 2020, he rejoined Colombo FC for a second spell, remaining with the club until 2022. In 2022, Chameera signed for Blue Star SC.

In 2023, he moved abroad to the Maldives, joining Tent Sports Club for the 2023–24 Second Division season. He featured in the club’s run to the semi-finals, where they were eliminated by eventual champions Mas Odi Sports Club, scoring in the semi-final.

In 2025, he joined TC Sports Club to compete in the Dhivehi Premier League.

== International career ==
Chameera has represented the Sri Lanka national team since 2015. He has earned multiple caps and has featured in international competitions, including FIFA World Cup qualification matches.

== Style of play ==
Chameera primarily plays as a centre-back but is also capable of operating as a right-back or defensive midfielder. He is known for his defensive positioning and versatility across the back line.

== Career statistics ==
=== International ===
As of match played 20 March 2025

Appearances and goals by national team and year
National team	Year	Apps	Goals
Sri Lanka
Sri Lanka	2015	3	0
Sri Lanka	2016	4	0
Sri Lanka	2017	0	0
Sri Lanka	2018	0	0
Sri Lanka	2019	8	0
Sri Lanka	2020	0	0
Sri Lanka	2021	10	0
Sri Lanka	2022	3	0
Sri Lanka	2023	1	0
Sri Lanka	2024	6	0
Sri Lanka	2025	1	0
Sri Lanka	2026	1	0
Total		37	0
