= Ayaaz Ahmed =

Maldivian association football player

Personal information
- Full name: Ayaaz Ahmed
- Date of birth: 20 July 1996 (age 30)
- Place of birth: Maldives
- Position: Forward

Team information
- Current team: Odi

Youth career
- 2012: Club AYL
- 2014: Maziya

Senior career*
Years	Team	Apps	(Gls)
2015–2017	Da Grande		
2018	Kuda Henveiru United	3	(0)
2019–2022	Da Grande		
2023–2024	New Radiant		
2025–	Odi	0	(0)

International career
2019	Maldives	1	(0)
2025–	Maldives (futsal)	2	(0)
- * Club domestic league appearances and goals

Ayaaz Ahmed (born 20 July 1996), is a Maldivian footballer currently playing as a forward for Odi Sports Club and Maldives national futsal team. Ayaaz is regarded as one of the best futsal players in Maldives.

== Club career ==
On 28 January 2018, he joined Kuda Henveiru United for the Second Division.

== International career ==
Ayaaz's first international match was a 2–1 defeat against Syria on 10 October 2019 at Rashid Stadium, Dubai, replacing Hussain Nihan in the 82nd minute.

== Career statistics ==
=== International ===
As of matches played 10 October 2019.

National team	Year	Apps	Goals
Maldives	2019	1	0
Total		1	0
