= 2023 Dhivehi Premier League =

Dhivehi Premier League
- Season: 2023
- Dates: 9 May – 19 December
- Champions: Maziya
- Relegated: None
- Goals: 214
- Top goalscorer: Rizuvan (23 goals)
- Biggest home win: Maziya 11–0 United Victory 19 November 2023
- Biggest away win: United Victory 1–8 Eagles 16 November 2023
- Highest scoring: Maziya 11–0 United Victory 19 November 2023 United Victory 1–8 Eagles 16 November 2023 Maziya 7–2 United Victory 9 May 2023
- Longest losing run: Valencia (12 matches)

The 2023 Dhivehi Premier League was the eighth season of the Premier League, the top Maldivian professional league for association football clubs since its establishment in 2015.

== Teams and their divisions ==
A total of 8 teams will be contesting in the league, including 7 sides from the 2022 Dhivehi League season and one promoted from the 2022 Second Division Football Tournament via play-off.

Note: Table lists clubs in alphabetical order.

=== Changes from the previous season ===
Promoted to the Premier League

- Buru Sports Club

Relegated to Maldivian Second Division

- Da Grande Sports Club

Team	Division	Stadium	Capacity
Buru Sports Club	Machchangolhi	National Football Stadium	11,000
Eagles	Maafannu	National Football Stadium	11,000
Green Streets	Machchangolhi	National Football Stadium	11,000
Valencia	Machchangolhi	National Football Stadium	11,000
Maziya	West Maafannu	National Football Stadium	11,000
Super United	Machchangolhi	National Football Stadium	11,000
TC Sports Club	Henveiru	National Football Stadium	11,000
United Victory	Galolhu	National Football Stadium	11,000

== Foreign players ==
- Player's name in **bold** indicates the player was registered during the mid-season transfer window

Club	Player 1	Player 2	Player 3	Player 4	Unregistered/Former Players (Note: Foreign players who left their clubs or were de-registered from playing squad due to medical issues or other matters.)
Super United Sports					
Buru Sports Club					
Club Eagles	(Kyrgyzstan) Askarbek Saliev	(Uzbekistan) Abdumalik Toshpoʻlatov	(Uzbekistan) Murodjon Tuychibayev	(Brazil) Ivan Carlos	(Montenegro) Milovan Petrovikj (Sri Lanka) Mohamed Ruskhan (Estonia) Daniil Petrunin
Club Valencia	(Spain) José Domínguez				
Green Street	(Pakistan) Saqib Hanif				
Maziya	(Serbia) Vojislav Balabanović	(Ghana) Obeng Regan	(Japan) Tomoki Wada	(Egypt) Khalil Gamal	(Croatia) Sebastijan Antić (Serbia) Branimir Jočić (Serbia) Stefan Mihajlovic
United Victory					
TC Sports Club	(Sri Lanka) Sujan Perera				

== League table ==
Pos	Team	Pld	W	D	L	GF	GA	GD	Pts	Qualification or relegation
1	Maziya (C)	14	13	1	0	56	4	+52	40	Qualification for 2024–25 AFC Challenge League group stage and 2025–26 AFC Challenge League qualifying stage
2	Eagles	14	11	2	1	57	17	+40	35	
3	Super United	14	10	0	4	35	21	+14	30	
4	TC Sports	14	7	1	6	21	24	−3	22	
5	Buru	14	6	0	8	18	26	−8	18	
6	United Victory	14	4	0	10	15	49	−34	12	
7	Green Streets (W)	14	1	2	11	8	43	−35	5	Withdrew
8	Valencia (W)	14	0	2	12	4	30	−26	2	Withdrew

Source: Dhivehi Premier League 2023
Rules for classification: 1) Points; 2) Head-to-head points; 3) Head-to-head goal difference; 4) Head-to-head goals scored; 5) Goal difference; 6) Goals scored.
(C) Champions; (W) Withdrew

== Results ==
=== First round ===
==== Week 1 ====
8 May 2023	**Valencia**	**0–2**	**TC Sports**	National Football Stadium, Malé
16:00		Report	Mohamed Muslih 16'; Eeras Ahmed 30'

8 May 2023	**Eagles**	**3–1**	**Buru**	National Football Stadium, Malé
21:00	Rizuvan 66', 80'; Ibrahim Mahudhee 90+'	Report	Mohamed Thashmeen 16'

9 May 2023	**Maziya**	**7–2**	**UV**	National Football Stadium, Malé
16:00	Naiz 11'; Hamza 26' (pen.), 68', 81' (pen.); Mihajlovic 70', 86'; Fasir 90'	Report	Shanaan 20'; Bassam 45+1'

9 May 2023	**Green Streets**	**1–5**	**SUS**	National Football Stadium, Malé
21:00	Anoos 88'	Report	Nizam 17', 54'; Aiham H 31'; Nasooh 33'; Ahnaf 85'

==== Week 2 ====
13 May 2023	**UV**	**0–3**	**SUS**	National Football Stadium, Malé
16:00		Report	Nasooh 11', 74'; Aiham H 43'

13 May 2023	**Maziya**	**5–0**	**Green Streets**	National Football Stadium, Malé
21:00	Raif 16'; Fasir 37'; Hamza 43'; Mihajlovic 73'	Report	Ibrahim Haseem (red card) 88'

14 May 2023	**TC Sports**	**0–1**	**Buru**	National Football Stadium, Malé
16:00		Report	Naim 90+4'

14 May 2023	**Eagles**	**3–0**	**Valencia**	National Football Stadium, Malé
21:00	Carlos 43'; Rizuvan 64' (pen.); Ibrahim Mahudhee 84'	Report

==== Week 3 ====
18 May 2023	**Eagles**	**4–4**	**TC Sports**	National Football Stadium, Malé
16:00	Rizuvan 7', 73'; Carlos 26'; Ibrahim Mahudhee 88'	Report	Saadh Mohamed 18'; Haisham 22'; Zuhair 49' (o.g.); Aiham H 56'

18 May 2023	**Valencia**	**0–2**	**Buru Sports**	National Football Stadium, Malé
21:00		Report	Mohamed Tashmeen 14'; Ahmed Rasheed 47'

19 May 2023	**Green Streets**	**3–1**	**UV**	National Football Stadium, Malé
16:00	Hameed 45+1', 62'; Anoos 90+2'	Report	Mohamed Hussain 90+4'

19 May 2023	**Maziya**	**3–0**	**SUS**	National Football Stadium, Malé
21:00	Hamza 14'; Fasir 63'; Raif 82'	Report

==== Week 4 ====
14 July 2023	**Green Streets**	**0–3**	**Buru**	National Football Stadium, Malé
16:00		Report	Samir 19', 90'; Naim 88'

14 July 2023	**Maziya**	**6–0**	**TC Sports**	National Football Stadium, Malé
21:00	Hamza 22' (pen.), 43' (pen.), 45' (pen.); Aisam 47'; Fasir 56'; Raif 90+2'	Report

15 July 2023	**Eagles**	**7–3**	**SUS**	National Football Stadium, Malé
16:00	Nisham Mohamed 6'; Carlos 20', 60'; Rizuvan 26', 80'; Ibrahim Mahudhee 31'; Zain 40'	Report	Husaam 42'; Nasooh 43'; Atheeg 90'

15 July 2023	**Valencia**	**0–1**	**UV**	National Football Stadium, Malé
21:00		Report	Shanaan 33'

==== Week 5 ====
19 July 2023	**Eagles**	**2–1**	**UV**	National Football Stadium, Malé
16:00	Rizuvan 43'; Ibrahim Mahudhee 81'	Report	Shanaan 45+3'

19 July 2023	**Valencia**	**0–5**	**SUS**	National Football Stadium, Malé
21:00		Report	Nasooh 5', 45'; Husaam 30', 35'; Atheeg 62'

20 July 2023	**Buru Sports**	**0–2**	**Maziya**	National Football Stadium, Malé
16:00		Report	Hamza 33'; Raif 61'

20 July 2023	**Green Streets**	**0–2**	**TC Sports**	National Football Stadium, Malé
21:00		Report	Haisam 42'; Ajmal 47'

==== Week 6 ====
29 July 2023	**Maziya**	**2–0** **(awarded)**	**Valencia**	National Football Stadium, Malé
16:00		Report
Note: Match forfeited as Club Valencia DNS

29 July 2023	**Eagles**	**6–1**	**Green Streets**	National Football Stadium, Malé
21:00	Carlos 12', 76'; Easa 15'; Ibrahim Mahudhee 37', 79'; Rizuvan 43'	Report	Ibrahim Hamid 90+5'

30 July 2023	**TC Sports**	**1–2**	**SUS**	National Football Stadium, Malé
16:00	Zayan 62'	Report	Husaam 34'; Nasooh 42'

30 July 2023	**UV**	**1–3**	**Buru Sports**	National Football Stadium, Malé
21:00	Shanaan 83'	Report	Naim 39' (pen.); Sattar 76'; Anwar 90+4'

==== Week 7 ====
3 August 2023	**SUS**	**2–1**	**Buru Sports**	National Football Stadium, Malé
16:00	Husaam 6', 50'	Report	Rasheed 56'

3 August 2023	**TC Sports**	**3–0**	**UV**	National Football Stadium, Malé
21:00	Zayan 12'; Samiu 21'; Ahnaf 50' (pen.)	Report

4 August 2023	**Valencia**	**1–1**	**Green Streets**	National Football Stadium, Malé
16:00	Ayan 85'	Report	Haseeb 13'

4 August 2023	**Maziya**	**2–2**	**Eagles**	National Football Stadium, Malé
21:00	Fasir 71'; Raif 73'	Report	Carlos 9'; Rizuvan 44'

==== Week 8 ====
8 August 2023	**UV**	**2–1**	**Valencia**	National Football Stadium, Malé
16:00	Shanaan 41'; Bassam 57'	Report	Ethan Zaki 12'

8 August 2023	**TC Sports**	**2–0** **(awarded)**	**Green Streets**	National Football Stadium, Malé
21:00		Report
Note: Match forfeited as Green Streets DNS.

9 August 2023	**SUS**	**2–0**	**Buru**	National Football Stadium, Malé
16:00	Nasooh 22', 50'	Report

9 August 2023	**Maziya**	**1–0**	**Eagles**	National Football Stadium, Malé
21:00

==== Week 9 ====
23 August 2023	**Maziya**	**3–0**	**SUS**	National Football Stadium, Malé
16:00	Jočić 30'; Balabanović 40', 70'	Report	Ethan Zaki 12'

23 August 2023	**Eagles**	**5–0**	**Buru Sports**	National Football Stadium, Malé
21:00	Carlos 14'; Ibrahim Mahudhee 34', 54', 82'; Rizuvan 49'	Report

24 August 2023	**TC Sports**	**3–0**	**UV**	National Football Stadium, Malé
16:00	Abdul Hamdhoon 2', 68'; Ahmed Rasheed 90+2'	Report

24 August 2023	**Green Streets**	**2–2**	**Valencia**	National Football Stadium, Malé
21:00	Ansar 18'; Raslaan 25'	Report	Sufyaan 11'; Ilan 45+3'

==== Week 10 ====
28 August 2023	**Eagles**	**8–0**	**Green Streets**	National Football Stadium, Malé
16:00	Rizuvan 7', 32', 54', 72'; Ibrahim Mahudhee 10', 33', 48'; Zain 15'	Report

28 August 2023	**SUS**	**2–0**	**UV**	National Football Stadium, Malé
21:00	Ahmed Hameed 31'; Atheeg 50'	Report

29 August 2023	**Valencia**	**0–2** **(awarded)**	**Maziya**	National Football Stadium, Malé
16:00		Report
Note: Match forfeited as Club Valencia withdrew.

29 August 2023	**Buru Sports**	**0–1**	**TC Sports**	National Football Stadium, Malé
21:00		Report	Zayan 33'

==== Week 11 ====
16 November 2023	**UV**	**1–8**	**Eagles**	National Football Stadium, Malé
16:00	Shanaan 80'	Report	Rizuvan 5', 18', 47'; Easa 57'; Petrovikj 62'; Zuhaan 72'; Zain 79'; Ibrahim Mahudhee 90+2'

20 November 2023	**SUS**	**2–0** **(awarded)**	**Green Streets**	National Football Stadium, Malé
16:00		Report
Note: Match forfeited as Club Green Streets withdrew.

20 November 2023	**TC Sports**	**2–0**	**Valencia**	National Football Stadium, Malé
16:00		Report
Note: Match forfeited as Club Valencia withdrew.

5 December 2023	**Buru Sports**	**0–6**	**Maziya**	National Football Stadium, Malé
21:00		Report	Hamza 7' (pen.); Balabanovic 26', 52', 65'; Wada 34'; Naiz 53'

==== Week 12 ====
19 November 2023	**SUS**	**2–0** **(awarded)**	**Valencia**	National Football Stadium, Malé
16:00		Report
Note: Match forfeited as Club Valencia withdrew.

19 November 2023	**Buru Sports**	**2–0** **(awarded)**	**Green Streets**	National Football Stadium, Malé
16:00		Report
Note: Match forfeited as Club green Streets withdrew.

19 November 2023	**TC Sports**	**1–2**	**Eagles**	National Football Stadium, Malé
16:00	Zayan 55'	Report	Ibrahim Mahudhee 40'; Rizuvan 68'

19 November 2023	**Maziya**	**11–0**	**UV**	National Football Stadium, Malé
21:00	Wada 19'; Balabanovic 33', 39', 45'; Raif 43'; Naiz 45'; Fairooz 55' (o.g.); Hamza 77', 83', 90+2', 90+3'	Report

==== Week 13 ====
23 November 2023	**Buru Sports**	**2–0** **(awarded)**	**Valencia**	National Football Stadium, Malé
16:00		Report
Note: Match forfeited as Club Valencia withdrew.

23 November 2023	**UV**	**2–0** **(awarded)**	**Green Streets**	National Football Stadium, Malé
16:00		Report
Note: Match forfeited as Club green Streets withdrew.

23 November 2023	**SUS**	**2–5**	**Eagles**	National Football Stadium, Malé
16:00	Atheeg 47'; Nasooh 87'	Report	Rizuvan 26', 79', 90'; Petrovikj 90'; Zain 90+7'

15 December 2023	**TC Sports**	**0–4**	**Maziya**	National Football Stadium, Malé
16:00		Report	Balabanovic 8', 77'; Aisam 17' hamza 25' (pen.)

==== Week 14 ====
30 November 2023	**Eagles**	**2–0** **(awarded)**	**Valencia**	National Football Stadium, Malé
16:00		Report
Note: Match forfeited as Club Valencia withdrew.

30 November 2023	**Maziya**	**2–0** **(awarded)**	**Green Streets**	National Football Stadium, Malé
16:00		Report
Note: Match forfeited as Club green Streets withdrew.

1 December 2023	**SUS**	**5–0**	**TC Sports**	National Football Stadium, Malé
16:00	Haisam 27', 37'; Sakhaau 34'; Alaau 40'; Ahnaf 57'	Report

1 December 2023	**Buru Sports**	**3–4**	**UV**	National Football Stadium, Malé
21:00	Naim 45+2', 90+2'; Huzaif 62'	Report	Faizan 71'; Areen 75' (pen.); Shanaan 88'; Looth 90+6'
