= FAM Awards =

Football Association of Maldives (FAM) Awards is organised by the Football Association of Maldives.

== Golden Boot ==
Year	Player
2004	(Maldives) Ali Ashfaq
2005	(Maldives) Ali Ashfaq
2006	(Maldives) Ibrahim Fazeel
2007	(Maldives) Ibrahim Fazeel
2008	(Maldives) Ibrahim Fazeel (20 goals)
2009	(Maldives) Ali Ashfaq (39 goals)
2010	(Maldives) Ali Ashfaq
2011	(Maldives) Ibrahim Fazeel (29 goals)
2012	(Maldives) Mohamed Umair (26 goals)

== Best Player ==
Year	Player
2004	(Maldives) Ali Ashfaq
2005	(Maldives) Ibrahim Fazeel
2006	(Maldives) Ali Umar
2007	(Maldives) Assad Abdul Ghanee
2008	(Maldives) Mukhthar Naseer
2009	(Maldives) Ali Ashfaq
2010	(Maldives) Ibrahim Fazeel
2011	(Maldives) Ibrahim Fazeel (1st) (Maldives) Ali Ashfaq (2nd) (Maldives) Mohamed Arif (3rd)

== Best Club ==
Year	Club
2007	Vyansa
2008	Club Valencia
2009	Victory Sports Club
2010	VB Sports Club
2011	VB Addu FC

== Best Woman Player ==
Year	Player
2007	(Maldives) Fadhuwa Zahir
2008	(Maldives) Fadhuwa Zahir
2009	(Maldives) Fathmath Shaliya
2010	(Maldives) Fathmath Shaliya
2011	–

== Three most recognised Referees ==
Year	Referees
2007	(Maldives) Mohamed Fareedh (Maldives) Ahmed Ameez (Maldives) Riyaz Rasheed
2008	(Maldives) Ahmed Ameez (Maldives) Mohamed Fareedh (Maldives) Mohamed Anil
2009	(Maldives) Ali Saleem (Maldives) Mohamed Anil (Maldives) Mohamed Fareedh
2010	(Maldives) Ahmed Ameez (Maldives) Ahmed Aslam (Maldives) Mohamed Anil
2011	(Maldives) Mohamed Fareed (Maldives) Jaufar Rasheed (Maldives) Ahmed Shifan Abdul Raheem

== Best Youth Player ==
Year	Player
2007	(Maldives) Hussain Nisham (Under13) (Maldives) Hassan Adhuham (Under19) (Maldives) Mohamed Umair (Under21)
2008	(Maldives) Hafil Hassan
2009	(Maldives) Hassan Saaif
2010	(Maldives) Mohamed Sadin Abdul Hannaan
2011	(Maldives) Ahmed Adhuham Rasheed (Under16) (Maldives) Guraish Abdhul Razzaq (Under19)

== Club with highest attendance ==
Year	Club
2009	New Radiant Sports Club
2010	NA
2011	New Radiant Sports Club

== FAM President's Award ==
Year	Player
2009	(Maldives) Ali Ashfaq
2010	NA
2011	–

== Popular Player (via fans' SMS) ==
Year	Player
2009	(Maldives) Mohammad Umair
2010	NA
2011	(Maldives) Mohamed Arif

== Fairplay Player ==
Year	Player
2007	(Maldives) Shamweel Qasim
2008	NA
2009	NA
2010	NA
2011	–

== Best Goalkeeper ==
Year	Goalkeeper
2007	(Maldives) Hassan Rameez
2008	NA
2009	NA
2010	NA
2011	–

== Special Contribution Award ==
Year	Person
2011	Mr. Ibrahim Nooraddeen; Mr. Hassan Nizar

== Special Recognition Award ==
Year	Company
2011	Dhiraagu; Milo; S.T.O. Think
