= Hamza Mohamed =

Maldivian footballer

Personal information
- Full name: Hamza Mohamed
- Date of birth: 17 February 1995 (age 31)
- Place of birth: Eydhafushi, Maldives
- Height: 1.68 m (5 ft 6 in)
- Positions: Winger; striker

Team information
- Current team: Maziya
- Number: 10

Youth career
- 2012: Baa Atoll Education Centre
- 2013: Eydhafushi Zuvaanunge Club
- 2014–2016: New Radiant

Senior career*
Years	Team	Apps	(Gls)
2014–2019	New Radiant	32	(5)
2019–	Maziya		(8)

International career^{‡}
2014–	Maldives U-23	4	(1)
2015–	Maldives	59	(7)
- * Club domestic league appearances and goals as of 20 May 2020 ‡ National team caps and goals as of 15:30, 25 June 2023 (UTC+5)

Hamza Mohamed (born 17 February 1995), nicknamed Hampu, is a Maldivian professional footballer who plays as a winger and striker for Maziya, and the Maldives national team.

== Club career ==
=== New Radiant ===
Mohamed has won the league with New Radiant three times; in 2014, 2015, and 2017.

=== Maziya ===
Mohamed won the league in his first season with the club, in 2019.

== Personal life ==
Mohamed married his longtime girlfriend, Aishath Shahuma, in November 2019. They had been dating for five years.

== Career statistics ==
=== International goals ===
==== Under–23 ====
Scores and results list Maldives U–23's goal tally first.

#	Date	Venue	Opponent	Score	Result	Competition
1.	27 March 2015	Sultan Qaboos Sports Complex, Muscat, Oman	Iraq	1–1	7–1	2016 AFC U-23 Championship Qualifiers
2.	13 February 2016	Indira Gandhi Athletic Stadium, Sarusajai	Nepal	2–2	4–3	2016 South Asian Games

==== Senior team ====
Scores and results list the Maldives' goal tally first.

#	Date	Venue	Opponent	Score	Result	Competition
1.	1 September 2016	National Football Stadium, Malé, Maldives	Bangladesh	3–0	5–0	Friendly
2.	27 March 2018	National Football Stadium, Malé, Maldives	Bhutan	1–0	7–0	2019 AFC Asian Cup qualification
3.	7 October 2021	National Football Stadium, Malé, Maldives	Bangladesh	1–0	2–0	2021 SAFF Championship
4.	14 June 2022	Markaziy Stadium, Namangan, Uzbekistan	Sri Lanka	1–0	1–0	2023 AFC Asian Cup qualification
5.	21 September 2022	Track & Field Sports Complex, Bandar Seri Begawan, Brunei	Brunei	2–0	3–0	Friendly
6.	22 June 2023	Sree Kanteerava Stadium, Bangalore, India	Bhutan	1–0	2–0	2023 SAFF Championship
7.	25 June 2023	Sree Kanteerava Stadium, Bangalore, India	Bangladesh	1–0	1–3	2023 SAFF Championship

== Honours ==
Maldives

- SAFF Championship: 2018

New Radiant

- Dhivehi Premier League
  - Champions (3): 2014, 2015, 2017
- Maldives FA Cup
  - Champions (1): 2017
- President's Cup
  - Champions (2): 2014, 2017
- Maldivian FA Charity Shield
  - Champions (3): 2014, 2015, 2016
- Malé League
  - Champions (1): 2018

Maziya

- Dhivehi Premier League
  - Champions (5): 2019–20, 2020–21, 2022, 2023, 2025-26
- Maldives FA Cup
  - Champions (1): 2022
- President's Cup
  - Champions (1): 2023
- Maldivian FA Charity Shield
  - Champions (3): 2022, 2023, 2025
