= 2025 Maldivian FA Charity Shield =

Maziya	Eagles
2	0
- Date: 15 September 2025
- Venue: National Football Stadium, Malé
- Man of the Match: Ahmed Aiham (Maziya)
- Referee: Mohamed Javiz

The 2025 Maldivian FA Charity Shield, is the 15th Maldivian FA Charity Shield, an annual Maldivian football match played between the winners of the previous season's Dhivehi Premier League and FA Cup. Since there were no FA Cup in the previous season, the game will be played between the league champions Maziya and runner-up Club Eagles.

== Background ==
Maziya and Club Eagles are qualified for the 2025 Maldivian FA Charity Shield as the winners and runner-ups of the 2023 Dhivehi Premier League, respectively. It will be the third meeting between the two sides in the Charity Shield match, Eagles winning in their first appearance in 2020 and Maziya won the most recent meeting in 2023. This will also be Eagles' third appearance in the Charity Shield, while Maziya have won record 5 titles from their 8 previous appearances.

== Match ==
18 September 2025
21:00 UTC+05:00

Maziya	2–0	Eagles
Aiham 45+1'; Naiz 67'	Report

National Football Stadium, Malé
Referee: Mohamed Javiz

Maziya	Eagles
