= Galolhu =

Galolhu ގަލޮޅު
- District of Malé
- Country: Maldives

Government
  - Council: Malé City Council

Population (2022)
  - Total: 28,484
- Time zone: UTC+05:00 (MST)

Galolhu (Dhivehi: ގަލޮޅު) is a district of Malé, Maldives.

== Location within Malé City ==
Galolhu is in the central and southern portions of Malé Island:

== See also ==
- Galolhu Rasmee Dhandu Stadium
