= Aisam Ibrahim =

Maldivian footballer

Personal information
- Full name: Aisam Ibrahim
- Date of birth: 7 May 1997 (age 29)
- Place of birth: Sh. Funadhoo, Maldives
- Position: Midfielder

Team information
- Current team: Maziya
- Number: 31

Youth career
- 2015–2017: Club Eagles

Senior career*
Years	Team	Apps	(Gls)
2015–2017	Club Eagles		
2019	TC Sports Club		
2020–	Maziya		

International career^{‡}
2015–2016	Maldives U19	3	(0)
2019	Maldives U23	3	(0)
2019–	Maldives	23	(3)
- * Club domestic league appearances and goals ‡ National team caps and goals as of 15 June 2021

Aisam Ibrahim (born 7 May 1997) is a Maldivian professional footballer who plays as a midfielder for Maziya.

== Career ==
Aisam started his career at Club Eagles, before joining T.C. Sports Club in 2019.

On 5 January 2020, Aisam joined Maziya on a three-and-a-half-year deal.

== International ==
Aisam was first called up for the senior Maldives national football team in 2019 for the 2019 Indian Ocean Island Games.

He made his official debut in the 2022 FIFA World Cup qualification first group stage match against Guam.

== International goals ==
No.	Date	Venue	Opponent	Score	Result	Competition
1.	13 November 2021	Colombo Racecourse, Colombo, Sri Lanka	Bangladesh	1–1	1–2	2021 Four Nations Football Tournament
2.	21 March 2023	National Football Stadium, Malé, Maldives	Pakistan	1–0	1–0	Friendly
3.	17 October 2023	Bashundhara Kings Arena, Dhaka, Bangladesh	Bangladesh	1–1	1–2	2026 FIFA World Cup qualification
