= Maldives national under-20 football team =

National association football team

Maldives U-20
- Nickname: Red Snappers
- Association: Football Association of Maldives
- Confederation: AFC (Asia)
- Sub-confederation: SAFF (South Asia)
- Head coach: István Urbányi
- Captain: Humaid Hussain
- FIFA code: MDV
First colours	Second colours	Third colours

The Maldives national Under-20 football team, also known as Maldives Under-20s or Maldives U20(s), is considered to be the feeder team for the Maldives national football team, and is controlled by the Football Association of Maldives.

== Results & Fixtures ==
The following is a list of match results in the last 12 months, as well as any future matches that have been scheduled.

Win Draw Loss Fixture

31 August 2026 2027 AFC U-20 Asian Cup qualification	Maldives	2–0	Brunei	Yangon, Myanmar
	Zaki 18'; Imran 31'	Report		Stadium: Thuwunna Stadium; Referee: Muath Owfi (Palestine)

3 September 2026 2027 AFC U-20 Asian Cup qualification	Sri Lanka	0–4	Maldives	Yangon, Myanmar
		Report	Imran 45+3'; Shamhaan 60'; Nasir 78', 80'	Stadium: Thuwunna Stadium; Referee: Hussein Abo Yehia (Lebanon)

6 September 2026 2027 AFC U-20 Asian Cup qualification	Myanmar	6–0	Maldives	Yangon, Myanmar
	Thaw Zin Ko 10'; Thura Min Thant 21', 53'; Imran 57' (o.g.); Kaung Khant Kyaw 71'; Swan Zar Ni 86'	Report		Stadium: Thuwunna Stadium; Referee: Venkatesh Ramachandran (India)

== See also ==
- Maldives national football team
