= New Radiant S.C. =

Maldivian football club

New Radiant
- Full name: New Radiant Sports Club
- Nickname: The Blues
- Short name: NRSC
- Founded: 1979; 47 years ago
- Ground: National Stadium; Malé
- Capacity: 11,850
- Chairman: Ahmed Mubeen
- Head coach: Francisco Caínzos
- League: Dhivehi Premier League
- 2025–26: DPL, 3rd of 10
Home colours	Away colours

New Radiant Sports Club is a Maldivian professional football club based in Henveiru, Malé. The club was founded on 19 August 1979 by Ahmed Waheed. New Radiant is the most successful in the Maldives in terms of trophies won and in the international arena. They were semi-finalists of the AFC Cup in 2005, and the only Maldivian club to have progressed beyond the group stage.

New Radiant has won the Dhivehi Premier League six times, FA cup 13 times and the Maldives Cup Winners' Cup four times. They won President's Cup 12 times and POMIS Cup 3 times. In 2019, the Football Association of Maldives suspended New Radiant from all football related activities due to unpaid wages and fines.

== History ==
=== 1994–99 ===
In the 1994 season, New Radiant won POMIS Cup and the FA cup. In the 1995 Season, the blues won POMIS Cup and National Championship / President's Cup. New Radiant won all the competitions that were held in 1997. In the 1998 season, the blues won FA Cup three times in a row and became first team to do so in Maldivian footballing history. In 1999, New Radiant won only Maldives Cup Winners' Cup. The club took part in the Asian Club Championship consecutively in the 1990s.

=== 2000–08 ===
In the year 2000, New Radiant won only Maldives Cup Winners' Cup. In the 2004 season, New Radiant claimed the FA Cup. In the 2005 season, the Blues reached the semi-finals of the AFC Cup and were beaten by the later champions Al Faisaly. In 2006 they won the FA Cup and the Dhivehi League. In the 2007 Season, the Blues were able to clinch 2 titles, the FA Cup and the President's Cup. In 2008, the Cup Winners Cup was won by New Radiant. They lost the FA Cup final.

=== 2012–15 ===
They won the 2012 Dhivehi League without losing a single match and also won the President's Cup by beating Victory Sports Club in the final. In 2013, the Blues won the first Charity Shield match and the league shield, becoming the first team to finish the league with a 100 percent record. In the same year, they won the FA Cup and finished the season by winning the President's Cup. In the 2014 season, the Blues won the Maldives FA Charity Shield by beating Maziya. The club won the 2014 Dhivehi League, third league title in a row. On November 30, New Radiant won 2014 President's Cup, also third time in a row. In 2015, the Blues reached the President's Cup final. The club won the 2015 Dhivehi Premier League.

=== 2016 ===
In 2016, New Radiant finished fifth in the league and in the group stage of the 2016 AFC Cup. After 2011, this was the year club did not win any of the tournaments.

=== 2017–18 ===
The Blues finished 3rd in the Male' League and got promoted to the 2017 Dhivehi Premier League. New Radiant won the Dhivehi Premier League and qualified for the 2018 AFC Cup group stage. They also won the 2017 Maldives FA Cup and the President's Cup. Next year, New Radiant finished second in the 2018 AFC Cup group F, and won the Male' League.

=== 2019–22 ===
In January 2019, the Football Association of Maldives (FAM) suspended New Radiant due to the club's failure to pay approximately MVR 3.8 million in wages to both local and foreign players. The club's leadership characterized the suspension as "politically motivated", retaliatory move by then-FAM president Bassam Adeel Jaleel against his critics. The suspension lasted over three years, until it was officially lifted in July 2022. This followed a government-backed initiative to settle the club’s outstanding debts. In their return to competitive football during the 2022 FAM Second Division, New Radiant delivered a strong performance but ultimately fell short to eventual champions Buru Sports Club.

=== 2023–24 ===
For the 2023–24 FAM Second Division, New Radiant were placed in a group with B.G. Sports Club, Tent Sports Club, Da Grande Sports Club, and Club Teenage. New Radiant again dominated the group stage, notably defeating Tent Sports Club by 3–1 and Club PK by 8–0, but fell short in the playoff semi-final.

=== 2025–26 ===
After a five-year absence from top-flight football, New Radiant officially returned to the Dhivehi Premier League for the 2025–26 season. The club's return was marked by administrative controversy. Despite a storied history, New Radiant failed to secure automatic promotion, having been eliminated in the semi-final of the 2024–25 FAM Second Division by rivals Victory SC. However, in August 2025, Super United Sports withdrew from the Premier League citing financial insolvency. On August 28, the Football Association of Maldives (FAM) Executive Committee voted to award the vacant 10th spot to New Radiant. The decision was justified on the grounds that New Radiant was the highest-ranked semi-finalist from the previous Second Division campaign The "backdoor" promotion drew sharp criticism from other Second Division clubs and football pundits. Opponents argued that the spot should have remained vacant or contested via a playoff. Allegations of favoritism surfaced in local media, pointing to the fact that several members of the FAM held past or present ties to the New Radiant board. Despite these challenges, the Maldives Sports Council upheld the decision, allowing the "Blues" to compete.

New Radiant appointed Ali Suzain as head coach, along with major signings like Ali Ashfaq and Ali Fasir, both returning for a fourth stint at the club. New Radiant began the campaign with a 6–0 victory over TC Sports Club and remained unbeaten for their first three matches.</ref> They ultimately finished the season in 3rd place with 37 points, trailing champions Maziya S&RC and runners-up Odi SC. In cup competition, the "Blues" reached the semi-final of the 2026 President's Cup (Maldives), falling to Maziya in the semi-final.

== Honours ==
=== Domestic ===
- Dhivehi League/Dhivehi Premier League
  - Champions (6): 2006, 2012, 2013, 2014, 2015, 2017
- Maldives FA Cup
  - Winners (13): 1989, 1991, 1994, 1996, 1997, 1998, 2001, 2005, 2006, 2007, 2013, 2017, 2026
- Maldives National Championship / President's Cup
  - Winners (12): 1982, 1987, 1990, 1991, 1995, 1997, 2004, 2007, 2012, 2013, 2014, 2017
- Maldivian FA Charity Shield
  - Winners: 2013, 2014
- Maldives Cup Winners' Cup
  - Winners: 1999, 2000, 2003, 2008
- Male' League
  - Winners: 2004, 2018
- POMIS Cup
  - Winners: 1994, 1995, 1997

=== Other ===
- Veterans Cup
  - Winners: 2013, 2015, 2016, 2017
- FAM Women's Football Championship
  - Winners: 2014, 2015

== Current squad ==
As of September 2026

Note: Flags indicate national team as defined under FIFA eligibility rules; some limited exceptions apply. Players may hold more than one non-FIFA nationality.

No.	Pos.	Nation	Player
1	GK	MDV	Xahran Hassan Ziyad
2	DF	MDV	Mohamed Yazdhan Hussain
3	DF	MDV	Mohamed Razaan
4	DF	ESP	Matías Hernández
5	MF	MDV	Mohamed Irufaan (captain)
6	MF	LBR	Abdulai Bility
7	FW	MDV	Ali Ashfaq
8	MF	BRA	Guilherme Silva
9	FW	BRA	Dorielton Gomes
10	FW	MDV	Ali Fasir
11	FW	MDV	Hassan Raif Ahmed
13	DF	MDV	Ahmed Abdulla
14	DF	MDV	Ahmed Vijudhaan

No.	Pos.	Nation	Player
15	DF	MDV	Mohamed Nizam
17	FW	MDV	Mohamed Naim
18	GK	MDV	Ahmed Sameer
19	FW	MDV	Ethan Zaki
21	MF	MDV	Ahmed Hamdhaan Azleen
22	GK	MDV	Mohamed Faisal
23	DF	MDV	Ibrahim Maisaan
24	FW	MDV	Mohamed Izaan Ali
26	MF	MDV	Moosa Yaamin
27	FW	MDV	Abdulla Aaish Ali
29	FW	MDV	Ahmed Husaam
30	FW	MDV	Ali Ilaan Ahmed
31	MF	MDV	Mujuthaaz Mohamed
42	MF	MDV	Umyr Mohamed Muizzu
44	DF	MDV	Amdhan Ali

== Season by season records (1979–1999) ==
Updated on 30 November 2015

Season	National Championship	FA Cup	POMIS Cup	Cup Winners' Cup	Season Top scorers	
Season	National Championship	FA Cup	POMIS Cup	Cup Winners' Cup	Name	Goal
1979		–	–	–		
1980		–	–	–		
1981		–	–	–		
1982	Champion	–	–	–		
1983		–	–	–		
1984	Runners-up	–	–	–		
1985	Runners-up	–	–	–		
1986	Runners-up	–	–			
1987	Champion	–	Group stage	–		
1988	Runners-up	Runners-up	–			
1989		Champion		–		
1990	Champion	Runners-up		–		
1991	Champion	Champion		–		
1992	Runners-up			–		
1993	Runners-up			–		
1994	Runners-up	Champion	Champion	–		
1995	Champion	Runners-up	Champion			
1996		Champion				
1997	Champion	Champion	Champion	–		
1998		Champion	Runners-up	Runners-up		
1999		Runners-up		Champion		

Champions	Runners-up	Third place	Undefined	Not qualified

- National Championship = President's Cup (Maldives)
- Cup Winners' Cup = Maldives Cup Winners' Cup
- – = Not yet Introduced or Not held

== 2000–present ==
Updated on 04 April 2026

Season	Dhivehi League / Dhivehi Premier League									Male' League	Charity Shield	President's Cup	FA Cup	POMIS Cup	CW Cup	Season Top scorers	
Season	Division	Pld	GW	D	L	GF	GA	Pts	Pos	Male' League	Charity Shield	President's Cup	FA Cup	POMIS Cup	CW Cup	Name	Goal
2000	DL									–	–	Third place	4th		Champion		
2001	DL									5th	–	NQ	Champion	NQ	Third place	(Maldives) Shah Ismail	17
2002	DL	7	3	1	3	13	8	10	4th	4th	–	4th	Runners-up	–	Third place	(Maldives) Mausoom	
2003	DL	12	7	1	4	24	18	22	4th	5th	–	Third place	4th	GS	Champion	(Maldives) Ali Shiham	
2004	DL	12	6	4	2	40	13	22	Runners-up	Champion	–	Champion	4th	–	Third place	(Maldives) Ibrahim Fazeel	
2005	DL	12	7	3	2	28	10	24	Runners-up	Third place	–	Runners-up	Champion	–	Third place	(Maldives) Ibrahim Fazeel	
2006	DL	12	9	1	2	29	16	28	Champion	4th	–	Third place	Champion	–	Runners-up	(Maldives) Ali Umar	
2007	DL	12	7	1	4	25	9	22	Runners-up	–	–	Champion	Champion	–	Runners-up	(Maldives) Ali Ashfaq	
2008	DL	12	6	2	4	28	19	20	4th	–	–	4th	Runners-up	–	Champion	(Maldives) Ahmed Thariq	
2009	DL	18	6	5	7	31	33	23	4th	–	NQ	4th	4th	–	–	(Maldives) Shamveel Qasim	
2010	DL	21	11	3	7	44	31	36	4th	–	NQ	Third place	Runners-up	–	–		
2011	DL	19	9	4	6	41	24	31	4th	–	NQ	Runners-up	4th	–	–	(Maldives) Ali Fasir	18
2012	DL	19	15	4	0	48	9	49	Champion	–	NQ	Champion	QF	–	–	(Maldives) Ali Ashfaq	22
2013	DL	19	19	0	0	73	5	57	Champion	–	Champion	Champion	Champion	–	–	(Maldives) Ali Ashfaq	44
2014	DL	19	17	1	1	57	8	52	Champion	–	Champion	Champion	Runners-up	–	–	(Maldives) Ali Fasir	23
2015	DPL	14	10	3	1	27	13	33	Champion	–	Runners-up	Runners-up	–	GS	–	(Maldives) Ashad Ali	7
2016	DPL	21	6	5	10	17	25	23	5th	–	NQ	GS	3rd	–	–	(Maldives) Izzath Abdul Baaree (Maldives) Hamza Mohamed	4
2017	DPL	14	13	0	1	44	9	39	Champion	3rd	NQ	Champion	Champion	–	–	(Maldives) Ali Fasir	21
2018	DPL	16	8	4	4	44	22	28	4th	Champion	CANCELLED	–	–	–	–	(Maldives) Ali Fasir	27
2025-26	DPL	18	11	4	3	42	16	37	3rd	–	NQ	Third place	Champion	–	–	(Maldives) Ali Fasir	15

Champions	Runners-up	Third place	Relegated	In progress	Undefined	Not qualified

- Pld = Played
- GW = Games won
- D = Games drawn
- L = Games lost
- GF = Goals for
- GA = Goals against
- Pts = Points
- Pos = Final position
- DL = Dhivehi League
- DPL = Dhivehi Premier League
- CW Cup = Maldives Cup Winners' Cup
- NQ = Not qualified
- n/a = No allocation slots in Maldives
- – = Not held or abolished
- QR2 = Second Qualifying Round
- R1 = Round 1
- GS = Group stage
- QF = Quarter-finals

== Continental record ==
Season	Competition	Round	Club	Home	Away	Aggregate
1991	Asian Club Championship	Qualifying Second round	(Bangladesh) Mohammedan SC	0–2	3–0	0–5
1993–94	Asian Club Championship	First round	(Pakistan) Youth League Club	3–0	0–2	5–0
1993–94	Asian Club Championship	Second round	(Bangladesh) Mohammedan SC	N/P^{1}	8–0	N/P^{1}
1993–94	Asian Club Championship	Quarter-final	(Saudi Arabia) Al Qadisiya	(w/o)^{2}		
1995	Asian Cup Winners' Cup	First round	(Sri Lanka) Ratnam Sports Club	(w/o)^{3}		
1995	Asian Cup Winners' Cup	Second round	(India) JCT FC	1–0	0–2	2–1
1995	Asian Cup Winners' Cup	Second round	(India) East Bengal Club	3–0	2–0	3–2
1995	Asian Cup Winners' Cup	Quarter-final	(Japan) Yokohama Flügels	0–2	5–0	0–7
1996–97	Asian Club Championship	First round	(Sri Lanka) Pettah United SC	0–2	(w/o)n/p^{4}	
1996–97	Asian Club Championship	Second round	(India) JCT FC	1–0	0–2	2–1
1996–97	Asian Club Championship	Quarter-final	(South Korea) Cheonan Ilhwa Chunma	9–0		4th
1996–97	Asian Club Championship	Quarter-final	(South Korea) Pohang Steelers	0–6		4th
1996–97	Asian Club Championship	Quarter-final	(Japan) Yokohama Marinos	10–0		4th
1997–98	Asian Cup Winners' Cup	First round	(China) Beijing Guoan	0–4	8–0	0–12
1998–99	Asian Cup Winners' Cup	First round	(Nepal) Mahendra Police	2–0	0–0	2–1
1998–99	Asian Cup Winners' Cup	Second round	(Hong Kong) Happy Valley	3–1	5–1	4–6
1999-00	Asian Cup Winners' Cup	First round	(Vietnam) Công An Thành Phô Hồ Chí Minh	1–3	1–0	1–4
2001–02	Asian Cup Winners' Cup	First round	(Bangladesh) Muktijoddha Sangsad	1–2	1–0	1–3
2002–03	AFC Champions League	Qualification First Round	(Sri Lanka) Air Force	2–1(a.e.t.)	1–1	2–3
2002–03	AFC Champions League	Qualification Second Round	(Japan) Shimizu S-Pulse	0–0	7–0	7–0
2005	AFC Cup	Group E	(Hong Kong) Happy Valley	2–0	0–2	2nd
2005	AFC Cup	Group E	(Singapore) Home United	1–0	2–0	2nd
2005	AFC Cup	Group E	(Malaysia) Pahang FA	1–1	1–0	2nd
2005	AFC Cup	Quarter-final	(Jordan) Al-Hussein (Irbid)	1–0	0–0	1–0
2005	AFC Cup	Semi-final	(Jordan) Al-Faisaly (Amman)	1–1	4–1	5–2
2006	AFC Cup	Group E	(Hong Kong) Xiangxue Sun Hei	5–2	2–0	4th
2006	AFC Cup	Group E	(Malaysia) Perlis FA	0–0	6–0	4th
2006	AFC Cup	Group E	(Singapore) Home United	5–3	2–0	4th
2007	AFC Cup	Group E	(Hong Kong) Happy Valley	0–2	2–1	4th
2007	AFC Cup	Group E	(India) Mahindra United	0–2	1–0	4th
2007	AFC Cup	Group E	Singapore Armed Forces FC	2–3	3–1	4th
2008	AFC Cup	Group E	(Malaysia) Perak FA	1–3	3–0	4th
2008	AFC Cup	Group E	(Hong Kong) Kitchee	2–1	2–0	4th
2008	AFC Cup	Group E	Singapore Armed Forces FC	0–3	1–1	4th
2013	AFC Cup	Group F	(Hong Kong) Sunray Cave JC Sun Hei	1–0	0–3	1st
2013	AFC Cup	Group F	(Indonesia) Persibo Bojonegoro	6–1	0–7	1st
2013	AFC Cup	Group F	(Myanmar) Yangon United	3–1	2–0	1st
2013	AFC Cup	Round of 16	(Malaysia) Selangor FA	(w/o)^{3}|2–0 (a.e.t.)		
2013	AFC Cup	Quarter-final	Al-Kuwait	2–7	5–0	2–12
2014	AFC Cup	Group E	(Singapore) Home United	1–0	2–0	4th
2014	AFC Cup	Group E	(India) Churchill Brothers	3–0	1–2	4th
2014	AFC Cup	Group E	(Indonesia) Persipura Jayapura	0–2	3–0	4th
2015	AFC Cup	Group H	(Indonesia) Persib Bandung	0–1	4–1	3rd
2015	AFC Cup	Group H	(Laos) Lao Toyota	2–1	1–1	3rd
2015	AFC Cup	Group H	(Myanmar) Ayeyawady United	0–3	0–0	3rd
2016	AFC Cup	Group F	(Singapore) Balestier Khalsa	2–2	3–0	4th
2016	AFC Cup	Group F	(Philippines) Kaya FC	0–0	1–0	4th
2016	AFC Cup	Group F	(Hong Kong) Kitchee	0–2	0–0	4th
2018	AFC Cup	Group E	(Bangladesh) Dhaka Abahani	5–1	0–1	2nd
2018	AFC Cup	Group E	(India) Aizawl FC	3–1	1–2	2nd
2018	AFC Cup	Group E	(India) Bengaluru FC	2–0	1–0	2nd

^{1} New Radiant apparently qualified for quarter-final; reason unknown

^{2} New Radiant withdrew

^{3} Ratnam withdrew after 1st leg

^{4} The 2nd leg was cancelled due to political violence in Sri Lanka.
