= Maziya S&RC =

Maldivian football club

Maziya
- Full name: Maziya Sports and Recreation Club
- Nickname: The Green Boys
- Short name: Maziya
- Founded: January 23, 1996; 30 years ago
- Ground: National Football Stadium, Malé
- Capacity: 11,850
- Owner: Maziya Sport And Recreation
- Chairman: Ahmed Sajid
- Manager: Tomáš Trucha
- League: Dhivehi Premier League
- 2025/26: Dhivehi Premier League, 1st of 10 (champions)
Home colours	Away colours

Maziya Sports and Recreation Club is a Maldivian professional football club based in Malé. They compete in the Dhivehi Premier League, the country's top division. The club was formed in 1996 and was promoted to the first division for the first time in 2006.

== History ==
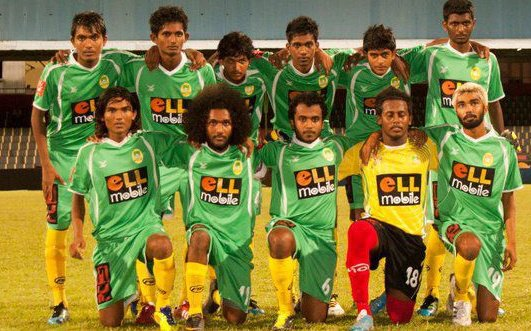
Youth players of Maziya S&RC in 2011

The club was founded on 23 January 1996. The club is one of the most successful clubs in Maldives, having won the top tier domestic league six times in 2016, 2019–20, 2020–21, 2022, 2023, 2025-26.

In the 2022 AFC Cup group-stages, Maziya witnessed a 1–0 defeat to Bashundhara Kings, but won their second match against Gokulam Kerala. They were knocked out of the tournament after a 5–2 defeat in the last match to Indian Super League side ATK Mohun Bagan. The club again featured in 2023–24 edition of AFC Cup.

== Seasons ==
=== Domestic ===
Season	League									FA Cup	President's Cup	Top goalscorer		Manager
Season	Div.	Pos.	Pl.	W	D	L	GS	GA	P	FA Cup	President's Cup	Player	Goals	Manager
2015	1st	4th	14	6	3	5	26	20	21	-	Winners	(Maldives) Asadhulla Abdulla	9	(Maldives) Ali Suzain
2016	1st	1st	21	14	5	2	48	25	47	Quarterfinal	Semi-finals	(Maldives) Asadhulla Abdulla	19	
2017	1st	3rd	14	8	3	3	30	10	27	Third	Semi-finals	(Maldives) Mohamed Umair	8	(North Macedonia) Marjan Sekulovski (Maldives) Ismail Mahfooz
2018	1st	2nd	16	12	2	2	51	17	38	-	-	(Maldives) Asadhulla Abdulla	14	(Maldives) Ismail Mahfooz
2019–20	1st	1st	21	16	3	2	74	12	51	Cancelled	-	(Saint Vincent and the Grenadines) Cornelius Stewart	15	(North Macedonia) Marjan Sekulovski
2020–21	1st	1st	14	10	4	0	34	6	34	Cancelled	-	(Saint Vincent and the Grenadines) Cornelius Stewart	10 goals	(Maldives) Mohamed Nizam (Serbia) Risto Vidaković
2022	1st	1st	21	20	0	1	85	5	60	Champions	-	(Spain) Tana	18 goals	(Maldives) Mohamed Nizam (Serbia) Risto Vidaković
2023	1st	1st	14	13	1	0	56	4	40	Cancelled	Champions	(Maldives) Hamza Mohamed	10 goals	
2025-26	1st	1st	18	15	3	0	53	9	48	-	Runners Up	(Spain) Sergio Mendigutxia	12 goals	(Spain) Luisma Hernandez

=== Continental ===
As of match played 1 November 2024

Competition	Pld	W	D	L	GF	GA
AFC Cup	48	14	8	26	69	90
AFC Challenge League	4	0	0	4	1	11
Total	54	14	8	30	70	101

Season	Competition	Round	Club	Home	Away	Aggregate
2013	AFC Cup	Group G	(Malaysia) Kelantan	6–1	1–1	3rd
2013	AFC Cup	Group G	(Myanmar) Ayeyawady United	3–1	0–3	3rd
2013	AFC Cup	Group G	(Vietnam) SHB-Đà Nẵng	2–3	1–3	3rd
2014	AFC Cup	Group F	(Vietnam) Hà Nội T&T	1–2	1–5	4th
2014	AFC Cup	Group F	(Indonesia) Arema Cronus	1–3	2–3	4th
2014	AFC Cup	Group F	(Malaysia) Selangor	1–1	1–4	4th
2015	AFC Cup	Play-off round	(Philippines) Ceres	1–0		
2015	AFC Cup	Group E	(India) Bengaluru	1–2	1–2	3rd
2015	AFC Cup	Group E	(Singapore) Warriors	2–0	2–0	3rd
2015	AFC Cup	Group E	(Indonesia) Persipura Jayapura	1–2	0–0	3rd
2016	AFC Cup	Group G	(India) Mohun Bagan	1–2	1–1	4th
2016	AFC Cup	Group G	(Hong Kong) South China	2–1	0–2	4th
2016	AFC Cup	Group G	(Myanmar) Yangon United	1–1	2–3	4th
2017	AFC Cup	Group E	(India) Bengaluru	0–1	0–1	2nd
2017	AFC Cup	Group E	(India) Mohun Bagan	5–2	1–0	2nd
2017	AFC Cup	Group E	(Bangladesh) Dhaka Abahani	2–0	2–0	2nd
2020	AFC Cup	Preliminary round 2	(Bangladesh) Dhaka Abahani	1–1	2–2	3–3 (a)
2020	AFC Cup	Play-off round	(India) Bengaluru	2–1	2–3	4–4 (p)
2020	AFC Cup	Group E	(India) Chennai City	Cancelled	2–2	2nd
2020	AFC Cup	Group E	(Bangladesh) Bashundhara Kings	Cancelled	Cancelled	2nd
2020	AFC Cup	Group E	(Maldives) TC Sports Club	Cancelled	Cancelled	2nd
2021	AFC Cup	Group D	(Bangladesh) Bashundhara Kings	0–2		4th
2021	AFC Cup	Group D	(India) Mohun Bagan	1–3		4th
2021	AFC Cup	Group D	(India) Bengaluru	2–6		4th
2022	AFC Cup	Group D	(Bangladesh) Bashundhara Kings	0–1		3rd
2022	AFC Cup	Group D	(India) Gokulam Kerala	1–0		3rd
2022	AFC Cup	Group D	(India) Mohun Bagan	2–5		3rd
2023–24	AFC Cup	Group D	(Bangladesh) Bashundhara Kings	3–1	1–2	4th
2023–24	AFC Cup	Group D	(India) Mohun Bagan SG	1–0	1–2	4th
2023–24	AFC Cup	Group D	(India) Odisha	2–3	1–6	4th
2024–25	AFC Challenge League	Group B	(Turkmenistan) Arkadag	1–2		4th
2024–25	AFC Challenge League	Group B	(Kuwait) Al-Arabi	0–2		4th
2024–25	AFC Challenge League	Group B	(Kyrgyzstan) Abdysh-Ata Kant	0–3		4th
2025–26	AFC Challenge League	Preliminary stage	(Kuwait) Al-Arabi	0–4		
2026–27	AFC Challenge League	Preliminary stage	(Tajikistan) Regar-TadAZ	0–3		

== Honours ==
- Dhivehi Premier League
  - Champions (6): 2016, 2019–20, 2020–21, 2022, 2023, 2025–26
- Maldives FA Cup
  - Champions (3): 2012, 2014, 2022
- Maldivian FA Charity Shield
  - Champions (6): 2015, 2016, 2017, 2022, 2023, 2025, 2026
- Malé League
  - Champions (1): 2017
- President's Cup
  - Champions (2): 2015, 2023
- Cup Winners' Cup
  - Champions (1): 2026
- POMIS Cup
  - Runners-up (1): 2015

== Current squad ==
As of September 2026

Note: Flags indicate national team as defined under FIFA eligibility rules; some limited exceptions apply. Players may hold more than one non-FIFA nationality.

No.	Pos.	Nation	Player
1	GK	MDV	Hussain Shareef
2	DF	MDV	Humaid Hassan
3	DF	SRB	Nemanja Zdaravkovic
4	DF	MDV	Yousuf Sidham
5	MF	SRB	Nikola Vujicic
6	MF	MDV	Nisham Mohamed
7	FW	MDV	Ibrahim Mahudhee Hussain
8	MF	MDV	Ibrahim Aisam
9	FW	MDV	Mohamed Ilan Imran
10	FW	MDV	Ahmed Aiham
11	FW	MDV	Abdulla Looth Ibrahim
12	FW	MDV	Anoof Abdulla
13	DF	MDV	Ahmed Hamees Areef

No.	Pos.	Nation	Player
14	DF	MDV	Eydhan Ahmed Moosa
15	MF	MDV	Mohamed Zeek Ahmed
16	FW	MDV	Nassah Ibrahim Nasir
17	DF	MDV	Samooh Ali (captain)
18	GK	MDV	Shaiman Rasheed
19	FW	MDV	Aidh Mohamed Jaweez
20	DF	MDV	Alhaan Faisal Ameen
21	FW	NGR	Benjamin Kuku
22	DF	MDV	Hassan Shifaz
23	MF	MDV	Nashiu Ahmed Shiham
27	DF	MDV	Mohamed Aiham Anwar
31	FW	BEN	Codjo Gomez
32	GK	MDV	Iyaan Abdul Aleem
44	DF	MDV	Haisham Hassan
