= Odi Sports Club =

Odi SC
- Full name: Odi Sports Club
- Nickname: The Sailors
- Founded: 2016; 10 years ago
- Ground: National Football Stadium, Malé
- Capacity: 11,850
- Head coach: Andrés García
- League: Dhivehi Premier League
- 2025–26: 2nd of 10
Home colours	Away colours

Odi Sports Club, is a Maldivian professional football club based in Galolhu in the city of Malé.

== History ==
The club was founded as Masodi Sports Club, and later changed their name to Odi Sports Club on 9 May 2024, upon getting promotion to first division.

They earned back to back promotion and reached the top tier of Maldives, winning the 2023–24 Second Division and securing first in the 2024 Dhivehi Premier League play-off. They were promoted to Second Division when they secured a spot from the of 2022 Third Division final, where they ended up as runner-ups.

Ian Gillan was announced as the club head coach on 9 March 2025, ahead of the preparations for their debut season at Dhivehi Premier League. In less than two months, on 5 May 2025, the club announced the sudden departure of Gillan, due to a personal family emergency; his father being diagnosed with cancer.

On 21 August 2025, Andrés García was announced as Gillan's replacement as the head coach.

== Kit sponsorship ==
Period	Kit manufacturer	Shirt sponsor (front)	Other sponsors
2016	Sports Power MV	–	–
2022	Obion	Odi Marine	–
2023–24	Obion (home); Dhizy (away)	The Norman	List: Sleeve: Palibu Maldives Wave
2025–	Obion	WellCo Maldives	List: Back: Obion Vaguthu.mv The Norman

== Season-by-season records ==
Season	League								FA Cup	President's Cup (Note: Only First Division teams are eligible to play in President's Cup.)	Top goalscorer		Head coach
Season	Div.	Pos.	Pl.	W	D	L	GS	GA	FA Cup	President's Cup	Name	Goals	Head coach
2016	Div 3 (3)								DNE	n/a			(Maldives) Mohamed Nisam
2017	Div 3 (3)	DNE											
2018	Div 3 (3)	DNE											
2021	Div 3 (3)	DNE											
2022	Div 3 (3) ↑	2nd	7 (Note: Includes 1 match against Maldives U19 where they won 4–2, but match is not counted as an official match according to FAM.)	6	0	1	17	5	DNE	n/a			(Maldives) Fareed Mohamed
2023–24	**Div 2 (2)** ↑	1st	7	7	0	0	28	3	cancelled	n/a			(Maldives) Mohamed Athif
2025–26	**DPL (1)**	2nd	18	12	3	3	40	12	TBC	Champions			(Spain) Andrés García

Key to league record:

- Pld = Matches played
- W = Matches won
- D = Matches drawn
- L = Matches lost
- GF = Goals for
- GA = Goals against
- Pts = Points
- Pos = Final position

Key to divisions:

- DPL = Dhivehi Premier League
- Div 2 = Third Division
- Div 3 = Third Division
- n/a = Not applicable

Key to rounds:

- DNE = Did not enter
- Grp = Group stage
- QF = Quarter-finals
- SF = Semi-finals
- RU = Runners-up
- W = Winners

Winners	Runners-up	Third place	Promoted	Relegated

Division shown in bold to indicate a change in division.

== Honours ==
=== Leagues ===
- Second Division
  - Winners: 2023–24
- Third Division
  - Runner-ups: 2022

=== Cups ===
- President's Cup
  - Winners: 2026
