= Club Valencia =

Maldivian football club

- Full name: Club Valencia
- Nickname: The Sunrisers
- Founded: 16 October 1979; 46 years ago
- Ground: National Football Stadium, Malé
- Capacity: 11,850
- Chairman: Adheel Jaleel
- Manager: Ahmed Mujthaba
- League: Dhivehi Premier League
- 2025-26: DPL, 9th of 10
Home colours	Away colours

Club Valencia is a Maldivian professional football club based in Malé. Nicknamed The Sunrisers, the club most recently competed in the Dhivehi Premier League, the top tier of Maldivian football.

== History ==
The notion of establishing a football club named Club Valencia arose in the late 1970s from the players of blue and gold teams participating in the Junior Football Pool organized by National Sports Academy.

The first two names proposed to the government for approval as the name of the club were Youth Recreation Movement and Juvenile Valencia Atletico; both were rejected. The third name, Club Valencia was then approved by the government.

The chairman of the club is Mr. Adheel Jaleel who was elected to the post in 2015.

== Players (2023) ==
Note: Flags indicate national team as defined under FIFA eligibility rules; some limited exceptions apply. Players may hold more than one non-FIFA nationality.

No.	Pos.	Nation	Player
1	GK	MDV	Mohamed Faisal
2	DF	MDV	Shafiu Ahmed
4	DF	MDV	Mohamed Sifaan
5	MF	MDV	Ahmed Rilwaan
7	MF	MDV	Abdul Wahid Ibrahim
8	MF	MDV	Ahmed Wisham
10	MF	MDV	Hassan Adham
13	DF	MDV	Akram Abdul Ghanee

No.	Pos.	Nation	Player
13	MF	MDV	Yoosuf Rameez
15	DF	MDV	Ibrahim Abdullah
16	MF	MDV	Ahmed Nishaan
19	DF	MDV	Hussain Mujthaba
23	MF	MDV	Shaheem Abdul Gadhir
25	GK	MDV	Ahmed Athif
29	DF	MDV	Abdulla Nawwaf
30	FW	MDV	Haidhar Akram

== Honours ==
Former crest of Club Valencia

- Dhivehi League: 5

2001, 2002, 2003, 2004, 2008

- Second Division: 1

2020

- Maldives FA Cup: 5

1988, 1995, 1999, 2004, 2016

- FAM Youth Championship: 2

2013, 2022

- Maldives Cup Winners' Cup: 3

1998, 2004, 2007

- POMIS Cup: 3

1992, 1996, 2001

- Charity Shield: 1

2009

Veterans

- Veterans Cup: 3

2010, 2011, 2012

- Veterans Association Cup – Veterans: 1

2014

- Veterans Association Cup – Masters: 1

2014

== Performance in AFC competitions ==
- AFC Champions League: 1 appearance

2002–03: Qualifying East – 2nd Round

- Asian Club Championship: 7 appearances

1986: Qualifying Stage
1992–93: Qualifying Stage
1995: Preliminary Round
1995: First Round
1996: Second Round
1999: First Round
2000: Second Round

- AFC Cup: 4 appearances

2004: Group Stage
2005: Group Stage
2009: Group Stage
2017: Preliminary Round

- Asian Cup Winners Cup: 2 appearances

1996/97: Second Round
2000/01: First Round

== Notable players ==
- (Ghana) Felix Aboagye
- (Maldives) Ibrahim Hamdhaan
- (Maldives) Ali Ashfaq
