= T.C. Sports Club =

Maldivian football club

Trust and Care SC
- Full name: Trust and Care Sports Club
- Founded: 22 September 2004; 21 years ago
- Stadium: Rasmee Dhandu Stadium
- Capacity: 11,850
- President: Ahmed Abbas
- Manager: Mohamed Athif
- League: Dhivehi Premier League
- 2025/26: 7th of 10

Trust and Care Sports Club (commonly known as TC Sports Club) is a Maldivian professional football club based in Malé. They have qualified for the Dhivehi League for the first time, after crowning the 2014 Second Division Football Tournament and securing their place at second, in the Play-off for 2015 Dhivehi League.

== History ==
=== Continental history ===
As of match played 4 November 2017

Competition	Pld	W	D	L	GF	GA
AFC Cup	5	2	0	3	7	14
Total	5	2	0	3	7	14

Season	Competition	Round	Club	Home	Away	Aggregate
2018	AFC Cup	Preliminary round	(Bangladesh) Saif	3–1	1–0	4–1
2018	AFC Cup	Play-off round	(India) Bengaluru	2–3	0–5	2–8
2020	AFC Cup	Group E	(Bangladesh) Bashundhara Kings	–	1–5	Cancelled
2020	AFC Cup	Group E	(India) Chennai City	–	–	Cancelled
2020	AFC Cup	Group E	(Maldives) Maziya	–	–	Cancelled

== Honours ==
- Sheikh Kamal International Club Cup
  - Champions (1): 2017

== Current squad ==
Squad for the 2026/27 Dhivehi Premier League

Note: Flags indicate national team as defined under FIFA eligibility rules; some limited exceptions apply. Players may hold more than one non-FIFA nationality.

No.	Pos.	Nation	Player
1	GK	NGA	Daniel Emmanuel Eybio
2	DF	MDV	Hassan Haisham Hamid
3	DF	MDV	Abdulla Hishan
4	DF	MDV	Ahmed Maeesh Mohamed
5	MF	MDV	Hussain Ahusam Moosa
6	MF	MDV	Izaan Shahid
7	FW	EGY	Mahmoud Ashraf Mahmoud Mostafa
8	FW	BRA	Magson Dourado
9	FW	MDV	Aiham Hamdhoon
10	MF	MDV	Maayiz Waheed

No.	Pos.	Nation	Player
11	FW	MDV	Mohamed Dhaanish Ibrahim
12	MF	MDV	Sujau Ahmed
13	DF	MDV	Hamdhoon Abdul Latheef
14	MF	MDV	Mohamed Mailan Ibrahim
15	MF	MDV	Hussain Faiz
16	MF	MDV	Yoosuf Ibrahim Waheed
17	DF	CMR	Armand Ngomba Nyame
18	DF	MDV	Abdulla Aslaan Abdul Hadhee
19	DF	MDV	Maaish Mohamed
20	DF	MDV	Hassan Eenaaz
21	MF	MDV	Mohamed Unais Bin Nooh
22	GK	MDV	Adam Im'aan
23	MF	MDV	Ahmed Alvin Hassan
24	FW	MDV	Naahil Nafiu
25	GK	MDV	Hussain Ibrahim
26	MF	MDV	Adam Shaheem
27	DF	MDV	Ibrahim Nuaim Sharumeel
28	FW	MDV	Mohamed Aayan Shaaz
29	FW	MDV	Ali Aflah Aneel
30	MF	MDV	Ali Afsal Ibrahim
31	DF	MDV	Mohamed Yoohan Faiz
32	MF	MDV	Ahmed Eeras
33	FW	MDV	Ibrahim Shafraz
34	DF	MDV	Mohamed Hoodh Faizan
37	DF	MDV	Abdul Wahid Ibrahim
