= 2015 Dhivehi Premier League =

Dhivehi Premier League
- Season: 2015
- Champions: New Radiant SC; 5th Dhivehi League title
- Relegated: Mahibadhoo SC
- AFC Cup: New Radiant SC
- Matches: 56
- Goals: 181 (3.23 per match)
- Best player: Naiz Hassan (TC Sports)
- Top goalscorer: Assadhulla Abdulla (9 goals)
- Highest scoring: Maziya 7–1 Mahibadhoo (20 November 2015); Club Eagles 7–1 Mahibadhoo (23 November 2015)
- Longest winning run: 4 games TC Sports
- Longest unbeaten run: 9 games New Radiant
- Longest winless run: 14 games Mahibadhoo
- All statistics correct as of 01 December 2015.

The 2015 Dhivehi Premier League was the first season of the Dhivehi Premier League, the top division of Maldivian football. The season began on 20 April 2015. The league was made up of the 8 clubs that broke away from the Dhivehi League at the end of the 2014 season.

== New league sponsors ==
From the start of the 2015 season, the Dhivehi Premier League was sponsored by Ooredoo Maldives.

== Teams ==
A total of 8 teams contested in the league, including 7 sides from the 2014 Dhivehi League season and one promoted from the 2014 Second Division Football Tournament.

=== Teams and their divisions ===
Note: Table lists clubs in alphabetical order.

Team	Division
BG Sports Club	Maafannu
Eagles	Maafannu
Valencia	Machchangolhi
Mahibadhoo	ADh Mahibadhoo
Maziya	West Maafannu
New Radiant	Henveiru
TC Sports Club	Henveiru
Victory	Galolhu

=== Personnel and kits ===
Note: Flags indicate national team as has been defined under FIFA eligibility rules. Players may hold more than one non-FIFA nationality.

Team	Head coach	Captain	Kit manufacturer	Shirt sponsor
BG Sports Club	(Maldives) Mohamed Shaazly		Grand Sport	Philips
Eagles	(Maldives) Ihsan Abdul Ghanee	(Maldives) Ismail Easa	FBT	Effect
Valencia	(Maldives) Mohamed Iqbal		Grand Sport	Philips
Mahibadhoo	(Bulgaria) Yordan Ivanov Stoikov			Makita
Maziya	(Maldives) Ali Suzain	(Maldives) Assadhulla Abdulla	Eve Garment	ADK Group, Makita, ell Mobile & t-sips
New Radiant	(Maldives) Sobah Mohamed (player-caretaker)	(Maldives) Ashad Ali	Adidas	Milo
TC Sports Club	(Maldives) Mohamed Nizam		Grand Sport	Hitachi
Victory	(Maldives) Ahmed Nashid			Nippon Paint

=== Coaching changes ===
Team	Outgoing Head Coach	Manner of departure	Incoming Head Coach	Date of appointment
Valencia	(Maldives) Mohamed Shahid	End of contract	(Maldives) Mohamed Iqbal	25 December 2014
Mahibadhoo	(Maldives) Mohamed Shiyaz	Contract terminated	(Bulgaria) Yordan Ivanov Stoikov	25 January 2015
BG Sports Club	(Maldives) Mohamed Iqbal	End of contract	(Maldives) Mohamed Shaazly	14 February 2015
Victory	(Maldives) Mohamed Athif	End of contract	(Maldives) Ahmed Nashid	1 March 2015
New Radiant	(Finland) Mika Lönnström	Sacked	(Maldives) Sobah Mohamed (player-caretaker)	2 March 2015
New Radiant	(Maldives) Sobah Mohamed (player-caretaker)	Arrival of head coach	(Bosnia and Herzegovina) Amir Alagic	11 March 2015
New Radiant	(Bosnia and Herzegovina) Amir Alagic	Resigned	(Maldives) Sobah Mohamed (player-caretaker)	12 April 2015

== Foreign players ==
Club	Visa 1	Visa 2	Visa 3	Visa 4 (Asian)
BG Sports Club	(Spain) David Carmona	(Trinidad and Tobago) Sean Bateau	(Nigeria) Daniel Philemon	(Pakistan) Saadullah Khan
Club Eagles	(Sierra Leone) Abu Mansaray	(Spain) Pedro Tarancon Anton	(Spain) Gerardo Jiménez Reyes	(Sri Lanka) Sujan Perera
Club Valencia	(Bulgaria) Vladislav Mirchev			
Mahibadhoo	(Ivory Coast) Lassina Koné			
Maziya	(Bulgaria) Zhivko Dinev	(Brazil) Silas Junior	(Spain) Pablo Rodríguez	(Japan) Toshiya Hosoe
New Radiant	(England) David Moli	(Slovakia) Viliam Macko		(Uzbekistan) Alisher Akhmedov
TC Sports Club	(Nigeria) Kudus Omolade Kelani	(Brazil) Rafinha	(Brazil) Everton Souza Santos	
Victory	(Nigeria) Chinda Chizi Kaka			

== League table ==
Format: In Round 1 and 2, all eight teams play against each other. Teams with most total points after Round 2 are crowned the Dhivehi Premier League champions and qualify for the AFC Cup. The top four teams qualify for the POMIS Cup & President's Cup.

=== Standings of round 1 ===
Pos	Team	Pld	W	D	L	GF	GA	GD	Pts
1	New Radiant	7	5	2	0	11	4	+7	17
2	TC Sports Club	7	4	2	1	14	8	+6	14
3	Maziya	7	3	3	1	12	9	+3	12
4	Club Eagles	7	2	4	1	11	8	+3	10
5	Victory	7	3	0	4	13	14	−1	9
6	BG Sports Club	7	2	2	3	9	8	+1	8
7	Club Valencia	7	2	0	5	10	16	−6	6
8	Mahibadhoo	7	0	1	6	4	17	−13	1

Source: rsssf.com
Rules for classification: 1) points; 2) goal difference; 3) number of goals scored.

=== Standings of round 2 ===
Pos	Team	Pld	W	D	L	GF	GA	GD	Pts
1	New Radiant	7	5	1	1	16	9	+7	16
2	TC Sports Club	7	4	3	0	12	4	+8	15
3	Club Eagles	7	4	2	1	13	5	+8	14
4	Club Valencia	7	3	1	3	15	11	+4	10
5	Maziya	7	3	0	4	14	11	+3	9
6	Victory	7	2	2	3	10	9	+1	8
7	BG Sports Club	7	1	2	4	9	18	−9	5
8	Mahibadhoo	7	0	1	6	8	30	−22	1

Source: rsssf.com
Rules for classification: 1) points; 2) goal difference; 3) number of goals scored.

=== Final standings ===
Pos	Team	Pld	W	D	L	GF	GA	GD	Pts	Qualification or relegation
1	New Radiant (C)	14	10	3	1	27	13	+14	33	Advance to 2016 AFC Cup Group Stage 2016 Dhivehi Premier League
2	TC Sports Club	14	8	5	1	26	12	+14	29	Advance to 2016 Dhivehi Premier League
3	Club Eagles	14	6	6	2	24	13	+11	24	Advance to 2016 Dhivehi Premier League
4	Maziya	14	6	3	5	26	20	+6	21	Advance to 2016 Dhivehi Premier League
5	Victory	14	5	2	7	23	23	0	17	Advance to 2016 Dhivehi Premier League
6	Club Valencia	14	5	1	8	25	27	−2	16	Advance to 2016 Dhivehi Premier League
7	BG Sports Club	14	3	4	7	18	26	−8	13	Advance to Relegation play-offs
8	Mahibadhoo (R)	14	0	2	12	12	47	−35	2	Relegation to 2016 Second Division Tournament

Source: rsssf.com
Rules for classification: 1) points; 2) goal difference; 3) number of goals scored.
(C) Champions; (R) Relegated

== Season summary ==
=== Result table ===
Round 1 ╲ Round 2	BGS	EAG	VLC	MAH	MAZ	NRA	TCS	VIC
BG Sports		0–0	3–5	2–2	1–0	1–4	1–4	1–3
Eagles	0–0		1–0	7–1	2–1	1–3	0–0	2–0
Valencia	1–3	1–2		5–1	1–2	4–2	0–2	0–0
Mahibadhoo	0–3	0–3	2–3		1–7	1–2	1–2	1–5
Maziya	2–2	1–1	2–1	1–1		1–3	0–2	3–1
New Radiant	1–0	1–1	3–1	2–1	1–0		1–1	1–0
TC Sports	3–1	2–2	2–0	3–0	1–3	0–0		1–1
Victory	1–0	3–2	2–3	2–0	2–3	1–3	2–3	

Source: rsssf.com

=== Positions by round ===
The table lists the positions of teams after each week of matches.

Team ╲ Round	1	2	3	4	5	6	7	8	9	10	11	12	13	14
BG Sports	1	5	6	6	6	5	6	7	6	6	6	7	7	7
Eagles	4	1	1	2	2	4	4	5	4	4	4	4	3	3
Valencia	7	7	7	7	7	7	7	6	7	7	7	6	6	6
Mahibadhoo	8	8	8	8	8	8	8	8	8	8	8	8	8	8
Maziya	5	4	2	3	3	2	3	4	5	3	3	3	4	4
New Radiant	2	2	3	1	1	1	1	1	1	1	1	1	1	1
TC Sports	3	3	5	5	4	3	2	2	2	2	2	2	2	2
Victory	6	6	4	4	5	6	5	3	3	5	5	5	5	5

=== Matches ===
==== Round 1 ====
A total of 28 matches will be played in this round.

20 April 2015 1	New Radiant	3–1	Victory	National Football Stadium, Malé
22:00	Viliam 19'; Rilwan (red card) 86'; Fazeel 90+1' (pen.); Ashad (yellow card) 90+2'; Alisher (yellow card) 90+4'; Fasir 90+5'	Report	(yellow card) 16' Ismail; 74' (yellow card) 90+1' Ziaan	Referee: Shifan Abdul Raheem (Maldives)

21 April 2015 2	Mahibadhoo	0–3	BG Sports	National Football Stadium, Malé
16:00	Jackson (red card) 35'; Shalim (yellow card) 41'	MS; Sun	16' Hamdhaan; (yellow card) 45+1' Naavy; (yellow card) 60' (goal) 81' David Carmona; (yellow card) 80' Bateau; 90+2' Muaz

22 April 2015 3	Valencia	0–2	TC Sports	National Football Stadium, Malé
16:00		MS; Sun	20' Nafiu; 74' Rafael

23 April 2015 4	Maziya	1–1	Eagles	National Football Stadium, Malé
16:00	Asadhulla 14'	MS; Haveeru	45+1' Easa

4 May 2015 5	Victory	1–0	BG Sports	National Football Stadium, Malé
16:00	Thasneem 25'	MS; Sun

5 May 2015 6	New Radiant	0–0	TC Sports	National Football Stadium, Malé
16:00		Report MS; Sun

6 May 2015 7	Maziya	2–1	Valencia	National Football Stadium, Malé
16:00	Hosoe 23'; Asadhulla 57'	MS; Sun	36' Shimaz

7 May 2015 8	Eagles	3–0	Mahibadhoo	National Football Stadium, Malé
16:00	Adhuham 13', 18'; Rizuwan 73'	MS; Sun

18 May 2015 9	Victory	2–0	Mahibadhoo	National Football Stadium, Malé
16:00	Hisam Saleem 52'; Ahmed Ziaan 90'	Report

19 May 2015 10	Eagles	2–1	Valencia	National Football Stadium, Malé
16:00	Imran Nasheed 54'; Ismail Easa 88'	Report	62' Ibrahim Abdulla

20 May 2015 11	Maziya	3–1	TC Sports	National Football Stadium, Malé
16:00	Ahmed Imaz 15'; Pablo Rodríguez 21'; Mohamed Umair 54'	Report	(?) Rafael Betim Marti

21 May 2015 12	New Radiant	1–0	BG Sports	National Football Stadium, Malé
16:00	Ashad Ali 6'	Report

1 June 2015 13	Victory	2–3	Valencia	National Football Stadium, Malé
16:00	Ahmed Niyaz 44'; Chinda Chizi Kaka 59'	MS; Sun	13' Akram Abdul Ghanee; 71' Ahmed Rilwan; 79' Vladislav Mirchev

1 June 2015 14	Club Eagles	2–2	TC Sports	National Football Stadium, Malé
21:00	Gerardo Jiménez Reyes 39', 46'	Report	42' (pen.) Rafael Betim Marti (?)Ibrahim Shafraz

2 June 2015 15	Maziya	2–2	BG Sports	National Football Stadium, Malé
16:00	Mohamed Umair (?); Ahmed Nashid 76'	MS; Sun	81' (pen.) Anthony Gilbert; 85' Ibrahim Shiyam

2 June 2015 16	New Radiant	2–1	Mahibadhoo	National Football Stadium, Malé
21:00	Viliam Macko 26' (pen.); Mohamed Sifan 59'	MS; Sun	20' Adam Sahir

21 June 2015 17	Victory	2–3	TC Sports	National Football Stadium, Malé
16:00	Godfrey West Omodu 67'; Bahajath Abdul Azeez 86'	Report	65' Ibrahim Shafraz (?) Kudus Omolade Kelani (90+?) Ahmed Zaad

22 June 2015 18	Eagles	0–0	BG Sports	National Football Stadium, Malé
16:00		Report

23 June 2015 19	Maziya	1–1	Mahibadhoo	National Football Stadium, Malé
16:00	Ahmed Nashid (?)	Report	2' Anderson da Silva Bina

24 June 2015 20	New Radiant	3–1	Valencia	National Football Stadium, Malé
16:00	Alamu Bukola Olalekan 7'; Ibrahim Fazeel (?); Hamza Mohamed 90+4'	Report	44' (pen.) Vladislav Mirchev

28 June 2015 21	Mahibadhoo	0–3	TC Sports	National Football Stadium, Malé
16:00		Report	6' Ali Nafiu; 13' Naiz Hassan; 60' Ahmed Rilwan

29 June 2015 22	Valencia	1–3	BG Sports	National Football Stadium, Malé
16:00	Hansley Awilo Ambia 87'	Report	3', 66' Manuel David Carmona Escobedo; 64' Hamdhaan

30 June 2015 23	Maziya	3–2	Victory	National Football Stadium, Malé
16:00	Pablo Rodríguez 43'; Mohamed Umair 83'; Ahmed Nashid 90+3'	Report	71' Ahmed Niyaz; 79' Godfrey West Omodu

1 July 2015 24	New Radiant	1–1	Eagles	National Football Stadium, Malé
16:00	Rilwan Waheed 4'	Report	46' Ahmed Rasheed

17 October 2015 25	BG Sports	1–3	TC Sports	Turf pitch 1, Malé
16:00	Manuel David Carmona Escobedo 66' (pen.)	Report	30' (pen.), 50' Rafael Betim Marti; 35' Yohei Iwasaki

18 October 2015 26	Valencia	3–2	Mahibadhoo	Turf pitch 1, Malé
16:00	Mazhar Abdulla 64', 65'; Ibrahim Abdulla 80'	Report	18' Nikomon Rodrigue Thahi; 41' Izzath Abdul Baaree

19 October 2015 27	Eagles	2–3	Victory	Turf pitch 1, Malé
16:00	Gerardo Jiménez Reyes 6'; Ansar Ibrahim 15'	Report	55' (90+?) Godfrey West Omodu; 57' Ibrahim Shathir

20 October 2015 28	New Radiant	1–0	Maziya	Turf pitch 1, Malé
16:00	Rilwan Waheed 77'	Report

==== Round 2 ====
A total of 28 matches will be played in this round.

24 October 2015 1	BG Sports	3–5	Valencia	National Football Stadium, Malé
15:50	Daniel Philemon 32', 67' (?)	Report	13' Hansley Awilo Ambia; 19' Ahmed Rilwan; 60' Ahmed Visam (?) Vladislav Mirchev

24 October 2015 2	New Radiant	3–1	Eagles	National Football Stadium, Malé
21:00	Ali Fasir 6'; Hamza Mohamed 44'; Viliam Macko 68'	Report	88' Ismail Easa

25 October 2015 3	Victory	5–1	Mahibadhoo	National Football Stadium, Malé
15:50	Ibrahim Shathir 4', 60'; Godfrey West Omodu 43', 83'; Ahmed Niyaz 82'	Report	21' Gasim Samaam

25 October 2015 4	TC Sports	2–0	Maziya	National Football Stadium, Malé
21:00	Yameen Ibrahim (?); Naiz Hassan 45+2'	Report

29 October 2015 5	Eagles	1–0	Valencia	National Football Stadium, Malé
15:50	Ahmed Rizuvan 73'	Report

29 October 2015 6	New Radiant	2–1	Mahibadhoo	National Football Stadium, Malé
21:00	Ashad Ali 6'; Mohamed Sifan 10'	Report	56' Ali Shalim

30 October 2015 7	TC Sports	1–1	Victory	National Football Stadium, Malé
15:50	Naiz Hassan 82'	Report	37' Mohamed Thasneem

30 October 2015 8	Maziya	0–1	BG Sports	National Football Stadium, Malé
21:00		Report	38' Hamdhaan

3 November 2015 9	New Radiant	2–4	Valencia	National Football Stadium, Malé
15:50	Ibrahim Fazeel 23' (pen.); Ali Fasir (?)	Report	11', 17' Ahmed Rilwan; 19' (?) Vladislav Mirchev

3 November 2015 10	TC Sports	2–1	Mahibadhoo	National Football Stadium, Malé
21:00	Rafael Betim Marti 71'; Ibrahim Waheed Hassan 81'	Report	88' Anderson da Silva Bina

16 November 2015 11	Maziya	3-1	Victory	National Football Stadium, Malé
15:50	Ahmed Nashid 50'; Asadhulla Abdulla 58' (pen.), 84'	Report	48' Mohamed Thasneem

16 November 2015 12	Eagles	0-0	BG Sports	National Football Stadium, Malé
21:00		Report

19 November 2015 13	TC Sports	2–0	Valencia	National Football Stadium, Malé
15:50	Yameen Ibrahim 68' (pen.); Ahmed Nizam 76'	Report

19 November 2015 14	New Radiant	4–1	BG Sports	National Football Stadium, Malé
21:00	Ali Fasir 22'; Viliam Macko 72', 88'; Ashad Ali 90'	Sun; PSM	26' Manuel David Carmona Escobedo

20 November 2015 15	Eagles	2–0	Victory	National Football Stadium, Malé
15:50	Ahmed Rasheed 47'; Ansar Ibrahim (?)	Report

20 November 2015 16	Maziya	7–1	Mahibadhoo	National Football Stadium, Malé
21:00	Asadhulla Abdulla 9', 50', 69', 75'; Ahmed Nashid 21'; Samdhooh Mohamed 53'; Moosa Yaamin 57'	Report	61' Ismail Nazeer

23 November 2015 17	Eagles	7–1	Mahibadhoo	National Football Stadium, Malé
15:50	Ahmed Rizuvan 4' (45+?); Ansar Ibrahim 27', 30' (90+?); Yasfaadh Habeeb 72'; 88' Abdulla Haneef	Sun; Haveeru	58' Anderson da Silva Bina

23 November 2015 18	Maziya	2–1	Valencia	National Football Stadium, Malé
21:00	Ahmed Nashid 24'; Pablo Rodríguez 90'	Report	73' Hansley Awilo Ambia

24 November 2015 19	TC Sports	4–1	BG Sports	National Football Stadium, Malé
15:50	Naiz Hassan 41'; Ali Nafiu 52', 58'; Ali Haafiz (90+?)	Report	68' Manuel David Carmona Escobedo

24 November 2015 20	New Radiant	1–0	Victory	National Football Stadium, Malé
21:00	Ashad Ali 28'	Report

27 November 2015 21	BG Sports	2–2	Mahibadhoo	National Football Stadium, Malé
15:50	?? (?); Daniel Philemon 62'	Report	30', 52' Anderson da Silva Bina

27 November 2015 22	Victory	0–0	Valencia	National Football Stadium, Malé
21:00		Report

28 November 2015 23	TC Sports	0–0	Eagles	National Football Stadium, Malé
15:50		Report

28 November 2015 24	New Radiant	3–1	Maziya	National Football Stadium, Malé
21:00	Adam Isham 24'; Hamza Mohamed 36'; Mohamed Karam (?)	Report	66' Moosa Yaamin

1 December 2015 25	Valencia	5–1	Mahibadhoo	National Football Stadium, Malé
15:50	Hassan Solah 1', 8'; Vladislav Mirchev 14', 41'; Nizamuddeen Faheem 64' (o.g.)	Report	71' Anderson da Silva Bina

1 December 2015 26	Victory	3–1	BG Sports	National Football Stadium, Malé
21:00	Godfrey West Omodu 31', 71'; Ibrahim Shathir 88'	Sun; Haveeru	78' Daniel Philemon

2 December 2015 27	Maziya	1–2	Eagles	National Football Stadium, Malé
15:50	Asadhulla Abdulla 54'	Report	16' Ismail Easa (?) Ansar Ibrahim

2 December 2015 28	New Radiant	1–1	TC Sports	National Football Stadium, Malé
21:00	Ahmed Abdulla 71'	Sun; Haveeru	7' Ibrahim Rizuvan

== Season statistics ==
=== Scoring ===
- First goal: Viliam Macko for New Radiant against Victory (19th minute, 22:19 UTC+05:00) (20 April 2015)
- Fastest goal:
- Largest winning margin:
- Highest scoring game:
- Most goals scored in a match by a single team:
- Most goals scored in a match by a losing team:

==== Top scorers ====
Rank	Player	Club	Goals
1	(Maldives) Asadhulla Abdulla	Maziya	9
2	(Bulgaria) Vladislav Mirchev	Valencia	8
2	(Nigeria) Godfrey West Omodu	Victory	8
4	(Maldives) Ahmed Nashid	Maziya	6
4	(Brazil) Rafael Betim Marti	TC Sports	6
4	(Maldives) Ansar Ibrahim	Eagles	6
4	(Spain) Manuel David Carmona Escobedo	BG Sports	6
4	(Brazil) Anderson da Silva Bina	Mahibadhoo	6
9	(Slovakia) Viliam Macko	New Radiant	5
9	(Nigeria) Daniel Philemon	BG Sports	5

==== Hat-tricks ====
Player	For	Against	Result	Date
(Nigeria) Daniel Philemon	BG Sports	Valencia	3–5	24 October 2015
(Maldives) Asadhulla Abdulla^{4}	Maziya	Mahibadhoo	7–1	20 November 2015
(Maldives) Ansar Ibrahim	Eagles	Mahibadhoo	7–1	23 November 2015

- ^{4} Player scored four goals

=== Clean sheets ===
==== Club ====
- Most clean sheets:
- Fewest clean sheets:

=== Discipline ===
==== Player ====
- Most yellow cards:
- Most red cards: 1
  - Rilwan Waheed (New Radiant)

==== Club ====
- Most yellow cards:
- Most red cards: 1
  - New Radiant

== 2016 Dhivehi Premier League play-off ==
The play-off were to be played between 7th placed team in 2015 Dhivehi Premier League, B.G. Sports Club and 2015 Second Division runner up team. Since recreation clubs of government offices are not allowed in the Football Association of Maldives first division football tournaments, the play-off spot was given to the fourth placed Club Green Streets. 2015 Second Division runner-ups were Police Club while Dhivehi Sifainge Club were third in the league table.

10 December 2015
21:00

BG Sports	4–1	Green Streets
	Report

National Football Stadium, Malé

12 December 2015
21:00

Green Streets	–	BG Sports
	Report

National Football Stadium, Malé
