= Ali Samooh =

Maldivian footballer

Personal information
- Full name: Ali Samooh
- Date of birth: 5 July 1996 (age 30)
- Place of birth: A. Dh. Mahibadhoo, Maldives
- Height: 1.83 m (6 ft 0 in)
- Position: Centre-back

Team information
- Current team: Maziya
- Number: 17

Youth career
- 2012–2015: Mahibadhoo
- 2016: Maziya

Senior career*
Years	Team	Apps	(Gls)
2014–2015	Mahibadhoo	22	(0)
2016–	Maziya		(3)

International career^{‡}
2013	Maldives U19		(1)
2014	Maldives U23		
2015–	Maldives	54	(1)
- * Club domestic league appearances and goals as of 23:02, 6 June 2026 (UTC) ‡ National team caps and goals as of 23:02, 6 June 2026 (UTC)

Ali "Samuttey" Samooh (born 5 July 1996) is a Maldivian footballer who plays as a centre-back for Dhivehi Premier League club Maziya and the Maldives national team.

== Club career ==
Samooh joined the youth team of Mahibadhoo Sports Club in 2012 and he is listed as being the player of the match in a youth match against Club Valencia on 28 January 2014. He debuted for the senior team during the 2014 season and he made thirteen appearances in 2014 and a further nine in 2015 without scoring for the club. He left in December 2015.

He joined Maziya on 14 December 2015. He debuted for the club in the 2016 AFC Cup during the 5–2 loss against Mohun Bagan Super Giant in the group stage on 23 February 2016, and he competed again in the group stage with Maziya in 2017. He was made club captain ahead of the 2023 season, and he scored in December 2023 during the 5–1 victory against Club Green Streets. He then scored two goals during the 2025–26 season.

He has won the Dhivehi Premier League on six occasions with Maziya (2016, 2019–20, 2020–21, 2022, 2023, 2025–26).

== International career ==
Between 2013 and 2014, Samooh represented Maldives at U19 and U23 level, scoring once for Maldives U19 in 2013.

He was first included in the squad for the senior Maldives team during the 2015 SAFF Championship and he made his debut during the tournament on 28 December 2015 during the 4–1 loss against Afghanistan. He won the 2018 SAFF Championship with Maldives, and he scored his first goal for Maldives on 19 November 2019 during the 3–1 victory against Guam during 2022 FIFA World Cup qualification.

== Statistics ==
=== Club ===
Only partial statistics are known.

Appearances and goals by club, season and competition
Club	Season	League			Asia	
Club	Season	Division	Apps	Goals	Apps	Goals
Mahibadhoo	2014	Dhivehi League	13	0	—	
Mahibadhoo	2015	Dhivehi Premier League	9	0	—	
Maziya	2016	Dhivehi Premier League		0	6	0
Maziya	2017	Dhivehi Premier League		0	5	0
Maziya	2018	Dhivehi Premier League		0	—	
Maziya	2019–20	Dhivehi Premier League		0	5	0
Maziya	2020–21	Dhivehi Premier League		0	3	0
Maziya	2022	Dhivehi Premier League		0	—	
Maziya	2023	Dhivehi Premier League		1	4	0
Maziya	2024	Dhivehi Premier League	—		3	0
Maziya	2025–26	Dhivehi Premier League		2	1	0
Career total			22	3	27	0

=== International ===
Appearances and goals by national team and year
National team	Year	Apps	Goals
Maldives	2015	1	0
Maldives	2016	5	0
Maldives	2017	3	0
Maldives	2018	7	0
Maldives	2019	4	1
Maldives	2020	—	
Maldives	2021	10	0
Maldives	2022	8	0
Maldives	2023	4	0
Maldives	2024	2	0
Maldives	2025	8	0
Maldives	2026	1	0
Total		54	1

Scores and results list the Maldives' goal tally first.

No.	Date	Venue	Cap	Opponent	Score	Result	Competition
1	19 November 2019	National Football Stadium, Malé, Maldives	18	Guam	1–0	3–1	2022 FIFA World Cup qualification

== Honours ==
Maziya

- Dhivehi Premier League: 2016, 2019–20, 2020–21, 2022, 2023, 2025–26; runners-up 2018
- Maldives FA Cup: 2012, 2014, 2022; third place 2017
- Maldivian FA Charity Shield: 2015, 2016, 2017, 2022, 2023, 2025; runner-up 2020
- Malé League: 2017; third place 2018
- President's Cup: 2015, 2023; runner-up 2021–22

Maldives

- SAFF Championship: 2018
- South Asian Super Cup: 2025
