= 2020 Maldivian FA Charity Shield =

Maziya	Eagles
2	3
- Date: 8 December 2020
- Venue: National Football Stadium, Malé
- Referee: Viktor Kassai (Hungary)
- Attendance: 0 (Note: The match was played behind closed doors due to the COVID-19 pandemic in the Maldives.)

The 2020 Maldivian FA Charity Shield, (commonly known as the 2020 Milo Charity Shield due to sponsorship reasons) is the 11th Maldivian FA Charity Shield, an annual Maldivian football match played between the winners of the previous season's Dhivehi Premier League and FA Cup. The game was played between Maziya, champions of the 2020–21 Dhivehi Premier League, and runner-up Eagles, as the 2020 Maldives FA Cup was cancelled and declared null and void due to the outbreak of COVID-19 pandemic in the Maldives.

This was the sixth appearance of Maziya in the FA Charity Shield, and debut appearance for Club Eagles. Maziya won thrice continuously in 2015, 2016 and 2017.

== Match ==
=== Details ===
8 December 2020
21:00 UTC+05:00

Maziya	2–3	Eagles
Samooh 2'; Mahudhee 10' (pen.)		67' Zain; 71' Naim; 75' (pen.) Rizuvan

National Football Stadium, Malé
Attendance: 0
Referee: Viktor Kassai (Hungary)

Maziya	Eagles

GK	26	(Serbia) Nikola Vujanac	(yellow card) 74'
RB	16	(Maldives) Hassan Shifaz
CB	23	(Maldives) Ali Samooh
CB	3	(Serbia) Petar Planić		(substituted off) 58'
LB	2	(Maldives) Ahmed Abdulla		(substituted off) 70'
LM	25	(Maldives) Hussain Nihan
CM	34	(Maldives) Aisam Ibrahim
RM	15	(Maldives) Ibrahim Waheed Hassan		(substituted off) 72'
RW	7	(Maldives) Ibrahim Mahudhee
CF	30	(Maldives) Asadhulla Abdulla (c)
LW	14	(Maldives) Hamza Mohamed
Substitutes:
GK	1	(Maldives) Hussain Shareef
GK	4	(Maldives) Abdulla Zimam
DF	17	(Maldives) Hassan Nahwaash
DF	17	(Maldives) Amdhan Ali		(substituted on) 58'
MF	32	(Maldives) Mohamed Irufaan		(substituted on) 70'
MF	28	(Maldives) Naiz Hassan
MF	54	(Maldives) Mohamed Naish Asjad
FW	24	(Maldives) Abdulla Junaid
FW	47	(Maldives) Mohamed Umair		(substituted on) 72'
Coach:
(Maldives) Mohamed Nizam

GK	26	(Maldives) Mohamed Sinaahu
RB	16	(Maldives) Hussain Sifaau (c)
CB	23	(Maldives) Ahmed Numaan
CB	3	(Maldives) Hisam Saleem
LB	2	(Maldives) Haisham Hassan
CM	25	(Maldives) Abdulla Sameeh Moosa
CM	34	(Maldives) Imran Nasheed
RM	15	(Maldives) Hassan Raif Ahmed
AM	7	(Maldives) Mohamed Naim
LM	30	(Maldives) Ahmed Rizuvan	(substituted off) 80'
CF	14	(Maldives) Zain Zafar
Substitutes:
GK	1	(Maldives) Hassan Aleef Ibrahim
DF	4	(Maldives) Humaid Hussain
DF	17	(Maldives) Jumail Jameel
DF	31	(Maldives) Riham Abdul Ghanee	(substituted on) 80'
MF	28	(Maldives) Ahmed Samah
MF	32	(Maldives) Areen Abdulla Ibrahim
MF	54	(Maldives) Solah Ali
FW	24	(Maldives) Hamdhan Abdul Sattar
FW	47	(Maldives) Shaifulla Ibrahim
Coach:
(Maldives) Mohamed Siyaz

Man of the Match:
TBA PLAYER (TBA TEAM)

Assistant referees:
Mohamed Saeed (Maldives)
Ahmed Ameez (Maldives)
Fourth official:
Ali Saleem (Maldives)

Match rules

- 90 minutes
- 30 minutes of extra time if necessary
- Penalty shoot-out if scores still level
- Twelve named substitutes
- Maximum of three substitutions, with a fourth allowed in extra time
