= Yasfaadh Habeeb =

Maldivian footballer

Personal information
- Full name: Yasfaadh Habeeb
- Date of birth: 9 September 1992 (age 34)
- Place of birth: M. Mulah, Maldives
- Position: Attacking midfielder

Team information
- Current team: Super United

Youth career
- 2013: Club Eagles

Senior career*
Years	Team	Apps	(Gls)
2011–2012	BG Sports		
2013–2015	Club Eagles		
2016–2018	Maziya		
2019–2021	Da Grande		
2021–	Super United		

International career
2014	Maldives U23		
2016–	Maldives	2	(0)
- * Club domestic league appearances and goals

Yasfaadh Habeeb (born 9 September 1992), known as Mulakey, is a Maldivian professional footballer who plays as an attacking midfielder for Da Grande Sports Club.

== Club career ==
Yasfaadh started his career playing for the Third Division side BG Sports Club in 2011. He played a vital role in their back-to-back promotions – gaining promotion to Second Division in 2011 and first division in 2012, before moving to Club Eagles in 2013.

On 28 February 2013, Yasfaadh made his official debut for Eagles in their season opener, also contributing an assist for Adam Shahir in the 4–2 win against his former club BG Sports. He scored his first goal for the club on 9 May 2013, in the 4–0 win against Club All Youth Linkage in Dhivehi League.

On 14 December 2015, Ysafaadh joined Maziya on a 2 year deal. He made his debut on 24 February 2016, in the 5–2 loss against Mohun Bagan, making his first appearance in AFC Cup.

On 21 February 2019, the newly promoted side Da Grande Sports Club announced the signing of Yasfaadh.

== International career ==
Yasfaadh represented Maldives at the 2014 Asian Games.

On 7 June 2016, Yasfaadh made his debut for the Maldives national team in the Asian Cup qualifying play-off round second leg fixture against Yemen at the Grand Hamad Stadium where they lost by 2–0.

== Honours ==
=== Club ===
BG Sports Club

- Third Division: Runner-up 2011
- Second Division: 2012

Club Eagles

- FA Cup: Third 2013
- President's Cup: Runner-up 2014

Maziya

- Dhivehi Premier League: 2016
- Malé League: 2017
- FA Cup: Third 2017
- FA Charity Shield: 2016, 2017
