= 2016 New Radiant S.C. season =

New Radiant
- Head Coach: Yordan Stoykov (until 18 August 2016); Nikola Kavazović (until 23 September 2016); Ashraf Luthfy (caretaker manage)
- Stadium: National Football Stadium
- Premier League: 5th
- FA Cup: Third place
- President's Cup: Group stage
- AFC Cup: Group stage
- Top goalscorer: League: Izzath Abdul Baaree; Hamza Mohamed; Velichko Velichkov (3 goals each); All: Izzath Abdul Baaree; Hamza Mohamed (4 goals each)
Home colours	Away colours

The 2016 season was New Radiant Sports Club's 37th year in existence as a football club.

== Background ==
The Blues appointed their former coach Yordan Stoykov who lead them to the Semi-finals of the 2005 AFC Cup for the new season. He was the coach of Mahibadhoo Sports Club which got relegated in the previous season. On 18 August 2016, he resigned after 4 straight losses in the league, aggregating 0–9 and New Radiant were also eliminated from the AFC Cup group stage without a win.

Despite appointing former coach Nikola Kavazović who lead them to 2015 Dhivehi Premier League glory on 3 September 2016, club was instructed by assistant coach Ashraf Luthfy as Kavazović was on a suspension by Football Association of Maldives since 2015. On 23 September 2016, New Radiant released Kavazović and appointed Ashraf Luthfy as the caretaker manager and Ahmed Niyaz as the new assistant coach until the end of the season.

== Kit ==
Sponsor: Samsung

Home	Away	Goalkeeper

== Competitions ==
=== Overall ===
Competition	Started round	Final position / round	First match	Last match
AFC Cup	Group stage	Group stage	23 February 2016	10 May 2016
Dhivehi Premier League	—	5th	19 April 2016	21 October 2016
FA Cup	Quarter-finals	3rd	30 October 2016	10 November 2016
President's Cup	Group stage	Group stage	15 November 2016	18 November 2016

=== Competition record ===
Competition	Record							
Competition	G	W	D*	L	GF	GA	GD	Win %
AFC Cup	6	0	3	3	2	8	−6	0.00
Dhivehi Premier League	21	6	5	10	17	25	−8	28.57
FA Cup	3	1	1	1	3	5	−2	33.33
President's Cup	2	0	0	2	0	7	−7	0.00
Total	32	7	9	16	28	45	−17	21.88

*Draws include knockout matches decided on penalty kicks.

=== AFC Cup ===
==== Group stage ====
Date	Opponents	H / A	Result F–A	Scorers	Attendance
23 February 2016	Balestier Khalsa	H	[ 2–2]	Izzath 50', Rilwan 90+3'	900
8 March 2016	Kaya	A	[ 0–1]		2,000
15 March 2016	Kitchee	A	[ 0–0]		1,603
12 April 2016	Kitchee	H	0–2		950
26 April 2016	Balestier Khalsa	A	0–3		706
10 May 2016	Kaya	H	0–0		870

Pos	Team	Pld	W	D	L	GF	GA	GD	Pts	Qualification
1	(Hong Kong) Kitchee	6	4	1	1	8	1	+7	13	Knockout stage
2	(Philippines) Kaya	6	3	1	2	5	2	+3	10	Knockout stage
3	(Singapore) Balestier Khalsa	6	2	1	3	6	10	−4	7	
4	(Maldives) New Radiant	6	0	3	3	2	8	−6	3	

Source: AFC
Rules for classification: Group stage tiebreakers

=== Dhivehi Premier League ===
==== Matches ====
Date	Round	Opponents	Result F–A	Scorers
19 April 2016	1	Maziya	2–3	Izzath 23', Velichkov 43'
4 May 2016	1	United Victory	1–0	Velichkov 70'
18 May 2016	1	BG Sports	0–0	
15 June 2016	1	Valencia	1–1	Suhail 40'
22 June 2016	1	Victory	0–0	
29 June 2016	1	Eagles	0–1	
10 July 2016	1	TC Sports	1–1	Segun 45+'
15 July 2016	2	Victory	1–0	Velichkov 90+'
21 July 2016	2	United Victory	3–0	Izzath 15', Hamza 44', Niyaz 60'
4 August 2016	2	TC Sports	0–3	
7 August 2016	2	Maziya	0–2	
13 August 2016	2	Eagles	0–2	
17 August 2016	2	BG Sports	0–2	
21 August 2016	2	Valencia	2–0	Muslih 71', Hamza 88'
26 August 2016	3	Maziya	0–2	
14 September 2016	3	Victory	1–2	Izzath 69'
20 September 2016	3	Valencia	1–0	Niyaz 50'
25 September 2016	3	TC Sports	0–2	
29 September 2016	3	Eagles	0–1	
17 October 2016	3	BG Sports	1–1	Hamza ?'
21 October 2016	3	United Victory	3–2	Samir 13', Mohamed 26', Suhail 88'

==== League table ====
Pos	Team	Pld	W	D	L	GF	GA	GD	Pts	Qualification or relegation
3	Eagles	21	10	8	3	23	11	+12	38	
4	United Victory	21	5	8	8	18	25	−7	23	
5	New Radiant	21	6	5	10	17	25	−8	23	
6	Club Valencia	21	5	5	11	23	29	−6	20	
7	Victory	21	5	4	12	22	44	−22	19	Relegation play-offs

Source: FIFAMaldiveSoccer Soccerway

=== FA Cup ===
Date	Round	Opponents	Result F–A	Scorers
30 October 2016	Quarter-finals	BG Sports	1–1 (aet) (3–2p)	Haneef 56'
6 November 2016	Semi-finals	TC Sports	0–3	
10 November 2016	Third place	United Victory	2–1	Hamza 17' (pen.), Adis 36'

=== President's Cup ===
Date	Round	Opponents	Result F–A	Scorers
15 November 2016	Group stage	Eagles	0–3	
18 November 2016	Group stage	TC Sports	0–4	

Pos	Team	Pld	W	D	L	GF	GA	GD	Pts	
1	Eagles	2	2	0	0	5	1	+4	6	Advance to knockout stage
2	TC Sports	2	1	0	1	5	2	+3	3	Advance to knockout stage
3	New Radiant	1	0	0	1	0	7	−7	0	

Source: President's Cup
Rules for classification: Tie-breaking criteria
