= 2013 B.G. Sports Club season =

BG Sports Club
2013 season
- President: Ali Murad
- Coach: Fabio lopez
- Dhivehi League: Not started
- FA Cup: Quarter-finals

The 2013 season is B.G. Sports Club's 1st season in the Dhivehi League.

== Month by Month review ==
=== November ===
BG completed their first signing for the upcoming 2013 Dhivehi League season, Mohamed Shaffaz of Victory Sports Club for one year. BG also completed the signing of VB Addu FC's defenders Ahmed Ashfan, Faruhad Ismail and Club Eagles' striker Ahmed Rilwan and goalkeeper Mohamed Yamaan. Maldives national football team player Ashad Ali, who signed to New Radiant from VB Addu FC for the 2013 season was also released to BG under his request to the New Radiant management. He signed a one-year deal with the club.

=== December ===
BG agreed to sell Maldives national under-23 football team defender Ahmed Nooman to Club Eagles. BG started strengthening their team by signing New Radiant young striker Mohamed Imran and midfielder Mohamed Hussain, VB Addu FC's Adam Fazeeh, Victory's defender Ibrahim Sinaz and Valencia goalkeeper Ibrahim Ifrah Areef. Moreover, Vyansa's Ahmed Zaad and Mazhar Abdulla also completed their signing to BG.

=== January ===
BG confirmed that Mohamed Shaazly will continue coaching to the club, and appointed Victory's former player and Club Eagles' former assistant coach Ismail Anil as the assistant coach.

== Transfers ==
=== In ===
==== Pre-season ====
Squad #	Position midfield	Player solah	Transferred From	Date	Source
	MF	(Maldives) Mohamed Shaffaz	(Maldives) Victory		
	DF	(Maldives) Ahmed Ashfan	(Maldives) VB Addu FC		
	DF	(Maldives) Faruhad Ismail	(Maldives) VB Addu FC		
	FW	(Maldives) Ahmed Rilwan	(Maldives) Club Eagles		
	GK	(Maldives) Mohamed Yamaan	(Maldives) Club Eagles		
	MF	(Maldives) Ashad Ali	(Maldives) New Radiant		
	FW	(Maldives) Mohamed Imran	(Maldives) New Radiant		
	MF	(Maldives) Mohamed Hussain	(Maldives) New Radiant		
	MF	(Maldives) Adam Fazeeh	(Maldives) VB Addu FC		
	DF	(Maldives) Ibrahim Sinaz	(Maldives) Victory		
	GK	(Maldives) Ibrahim Ifrah Areef	(Maldives) Valencia		
	MF	(Maldives) Ahmed Zaad	(Maldives) Vyansa		
	FW	(Maldives) Mazhar Abdulla	(Maldives) Vyansa		
	DF	(Maldives) Samah Hussain	(Maldives) New Radiant	31 January 2013	
	DF	(Nigeria) Kudus Omolade Kelani	(Maldives) New Radiant	3 February 2013	
	MF	(Maldives) Ibrahim Fazeel	(Maldives) New Radiant	4 February 2013	

=== Out ===
==== Pre-season ====
Squad #	Position	Player	Transferred To	Date	Source
2	DF	(Maldives) Ahmed Nooman	(Maldives) Club Eagles		

== Competitions ==
=== Overall ===
Competition	Started round	Current position / round	Final position / round	First match	Last match
Dhivehi League	—	—			
Maldives FA Cup	—	—			
President's Cup (Maldives)	—	—			

Last updated: 1 January 2013
Source: Competitions
