= Hussain Shareef =

Maldivian footballer

Personal information
- Full name: Hussain Shareef
- Date of birth: 5 September 1998 (age 28)
- Place of birth: Kinbidhoo, Maldives
- Position: Goalkeeper

Team information
- Current team: Maziya
- Number: 1

Youth career
- 2015–2019: Maziya

Senior career*
Years	Team	Apps	(Gls)
2016–	Maziya	27	(0)

International career^{‡}
2019–	Maldives U23	3	(0)
2018–	Maldives	1	(0)
Medal record
Men's football
Maldives
Winner	SAFF Championship	2018
- * Club domestic league appearances and goals as of 22 April 2021 ‡ National team caps and goals as of 3 June 2021

Hussain Shareef (born 5 September 1998), is a Maldivian footballer who plays as a goalkeeper for Dhivehi Premier League club, Maziya and the Maldives national team.

== Club career ==
Hussain Shareef joined Maziya Academy in 2015, breaking through to the first team for the 2016 season.

Upon the departure of Maziya goalkeeper Mauro Boerchio, Shareef made his club debut on 28 May 2018, in the 2018 Malé League against United Victory, keeping a chean sheet in the 2-0 win.

On 11 March 2020, Shareef made his AFC Cup debut against Chennai City at the Jawaharlal Nehru Stadium, India, in the 2–2 draw, as their first choice Ovays Azizi was suspended after being cautioned in both legs of the 2020 AFC Cup play-offs against Bengaluru.

In the 2020–21 season, Shareef kept 4 clean sheets in 5 Dhivehi Premier League games, conceding only one goal.

== International career ==
Shareef was first called up to the Maldives national team in November 2017, for the 2019 AFC Asian Cup qualification third round game against Palestine. He was also included in coach Petar Segrt's final 20-man squad for the 2018 SAFF Championship but was an unused substitute throughout the tournament, in which the Maldives were the eventual winners.

He made his senior international debut on 3 November 2018, in a 3–0 defeat against Malaysia.

After making his debut for the senior national team, Shareef was selected in the Maldives under-23 national team for the 2020 AFC U-23 Championship qualification in Saudi Arabia.

== Personal life ==
Hussain Shareef married his girlfriend Aishath Layaal on 20 December 2020.

== Career statistics ==
=== Club ===
As of match played 24 August 2021

Appearances and goals by club, season and competition
Club	Season	Division	League		FA Cup		President's Cup		Continental (Note: All appearances in AFC Cup)		Other		Total	
Club	Season	Division	Apps	Goals	Apps	Goals	Apps	Goals	Apps	Goals	Apps	Goals	Apps	Goals
Maziya	2016	Premier League	0	0	0	0	0	0	0	0	0	0	0	0
Maziya	2017	Malé League	0	0	0	0	0	0	0	0	0	0	0	0
Maziya	2017	Premier League	0	0	0	0	0	0	0	0	0	0	0	0
Maziya	2018	Malé League	4	0	0	0	0	0	0	0	0	0	20	0
Maziya	2018	Premier League	16	0	0	0	0	0	0	0	0	0	20	0
Maziya	2019–20	Premier League	2	0	0	0	—		1	0	0	0	3	0
Maziya	2020–21	Premier League	5	0	—		—		1	0	0	0	6	0
Maziya	Total		27	0	0	0	0	0	2	0	0	0	29	0
Career totals			27	0	0	0	0	0	2	0	0	0	29	0

=== International ===
As of match played 26 March 2019

Appearances and goals by national team and year
National team	Year	Apps	Goals
Maldives U23
Maldives U23	2019	3	0
Total		3	0
Maldives
Maldives	2018	1	0
Total		1	0

== Honours ==
Maziya

- FA Charity Shield: 2016, 2017
- Malé League: 2017
- Dhivehi Premier League: 2016, 2019–20, 2020–21

Maldives

- SAFF Championship: 2018
