= 2014 Dhivehi League =

Dhivehi League
- Season: 2014
- Champions: New Radiant; 4th Dhivehi League title
- Relegated: Club AYL
- AFC Cup: New Radiant
- Matches: 71
- Goals: 252 (3.55 per match)
- Top goalscorer: Assadhulla Abdulla (22 goals)
- Highest scoring: Maziya 8–1 Mahibadhoo (12 July 2014); Maziya 8–1 Club AYL (27 July 2014)
- Longest winning run: 11 games New Radiant
- Longest unbeaten run: 12 games New Radiant
- Longest winless run: 13 games Club AYL

Statistics of Dhivehi League for the 2014 season. 2014 Dhivehi League started on June 16.

== Teams ==
- BG Sports Club
- Club All Youth Linkage
- Club Eagles
- Club Valencia
- Mahibadhoo SC
- Maziya S&RC
- New Radiant SC
- Victory SC

=== Personnel ===
Note: Flags indicate national team as has been defined under FIFA eligibility rules. Players may hold more than one non-FIFA nationality.

Team	Coach	Captain	Shirt sponsor
B.G. Sports Club	(Maldives) Mohamed Iqbal	(Maldives) Ahmed Ashfan	Al Mudhish
Club All Youth Linkage	(Maldives) Ahmed Nashid	(Maldives) Abdulla Zubair (Note: Ali Zubair was the captain at the start of the season.)	Nippon Paint
Club Eagles	(Maldives) Ihsan Abdul Ghanee	(Maldives) Assad Abdul Ghanee	Hitachi
Club Valencia	(Maldives) Mohamed Shahid	(Maldives) Abdulla Haneef	Philips
Mahibadhoo SC	(Maldives) Mohamed Shiyaz	(Maldives) Ali Risham	Makita
Maziya S&RC	(Maldives) Ali Suzain	(Maldives) Assadhulla Abdulla	ell mobile Makita
New Radiant SC	(Maldives) Ismail Anil	(Maldives) Imran Mohamed	Milo
Victory SC	(Maldives) Mohamed Athif	(Maldives) Hussain Shimaz (Note: Sobah Mohamed was the captain until he left the club at the end of league round 1.)	STO Noofahi

=== Managerial changes ===
Team	Outgoing manager	Manner of departure	Date of vacancy	Position in table	Incoming manager	Date of appointment
Maziya S&RC	(Maldives) Ismail Mahfooz	Resign	19 June 2014	4th	(Maldives) Ali Suzain	22 June 2014
New Radiant SC	(Maldives) Ismail Anil	Sack^{*}	6 August 2014	2nd	(Finland) Mika Lönnström	6 August 2014

^{*} Anil continues as assistant coach.

== League table ==
Format: In Round 1 and Round 2, all eight teams play against each other. Top six teams after Round 2 play against each other in Round 3. Teams with most total points after Round 3 are crowned the Dhivehi League champions and qualify for the AFC Cup. The top four teams qualify for the President's Cup. Bottom two teams after Round 2 play against top two teams of Second Division in Dhivehi League Qualification for places in next year's Dhivehi League.

=== Standings of round 1 ===
Pos	Team	Pld	W	D	L	GF	GA	GD	Pts
1	Maziya S&RC	7	6	1	0	29	6	+23	19
2	New Radiant SC	7	6	0	1	27	2	+25	18
3	Club Eagles	7	5	0	2	19	9	+10	15
4	Victory SC	7	3	1	3	11	13	−2	10
5	Mahibadhoo SC	7	2	1	4	13	27	−14	7
6	Club Valencia	7	1	3	3	7	14	−7	6
7	Club All Youth Linkage	7	1	1	5	4	25	−21	4
8	BG Sports Club	7	0	1	6	6	20	−14	1

Rules for classification: 1) points; 2) goal difference; 3) number of goals scored.

=== Standings of round 2 ===
Pos	Team	Pld	W	D	L	GF	GA	GD	Pts
1	New Radiant SC	7	7	0	0	19	3	+16	21
2	Maziya S&RC	7	6	0	1	19	5	+14	18
3	Victory SC	7	3	1	3	12	10	+2	10
4	Club Eagles	7	2	2	3	8	8	0	8
5	Club Valencia	7	2	1	4	4	10	−6	7
6	Club All Youth Linkage	7	1	3	3	6	15	−9	6
7	BG Sports Club	7	1	2	4	7	19	−12	5
8	Mahibadhoo SC	7	1	1	5	9	14	−5	4

Rules for classification: 1) points; 2) goal difference; 3) number of goals scored.

=== Standings of round 3 ===
Pos	Team	Pld	W	D	L	GF	GA	GD	Pts
1	New Radiant SC	5	4	1	0	11	3	+8	13
2	Club Eagles	5	4	0	1	13	5	+8	12
3	Maziya S&RC	5	2	2	1	13	8	+5	8
4	Club Valencia	5	1	1	3	4	9	−5	4
5	Victory SC	5	1	0	4	7	11	−4	3
6	Mahibadhoo SC	5	1	0	4	5	17	−12	3

Rules for classification: 1) points; 2) goal difference; 3) number of goals scored.

=== Final standings ===
Pos	Team	Pld	W	D	L	GF	GA	GD	Pts	Qualification
1	New Radiant SC	19	17	1	1	57	8	+49	52	2015 AFC Cup group stage
2	Maziya S&RC	19	14	3	2	61	19	+42	45	
3	Club Eagles	19	11	2	6	40	22	+18	35	
4	Victory Sports Club	19	8	2	9	30	33	−3	26	
5	Club Valencia	19	4	5	10	15	33	−18	17	
6	Mahibadhoo SC	19	4	2	13	26	58	−32	14	
7	Club All Youth Linkage	14	2	4	8	10	40	−30	10	Promotion/relegation playoff
8	BG Sports Club	14	1	3	10	13	39	−26	6	Promotion/relegation playoff

Rules for classification: 1) points; 2) goal difference; 3) number of goals scored.

=== Positions by round ===
The table lists the positions of teams after each week of matches.

Team ╲ Round	1	2	3	4	5	6	7	8	9	10	11	12	13	14	15	16	17	18	19
BG Sports Club	3	5	6	7	7	7	8	8	8	8	8	8	8	8	-	-	-	-	-
Club All Youth Linkage	8	8	8	8	8	8	7	7	7	7	7	7	7	7	-	-	-	-	-
Club Eagles	2	2	2	3	3	3	3	3	3	3	3	3	3	3	3	3	3	3	3
Club Valencia	5	6	4	4	6	6	6	6	6	6	6	6	6	5	5	5	5	5	5
Mahibadhoo SC	7	4	5	6	5	5	5	5	5	5	5	5	5	6	6	6	6	6	6
Maziya S&RC	4	3	3	2	2	2	1	2	2	2	2	2	2	2	2	2	2	2	2
New Radiant SC	1	1	1	1	1	1	2	1	1	1	1	1	1	1	1	1	1	1	1
Victory Sports Club	6	7	7	5	4	4	4	4	4	4	4	4	4	4	4	4	4	4	4

Updated to match(es) played on 1 November 2014. Source:

== Matches ==
=== Round 1 matches ===
A total of 28 matches will be played in this round.

16 June 2014 1	New Radiant SC	7–0	Club All Youth Linkage	National Football Stadium, Malé
16:00	David 9', 28'; Umair 11', 84' (pen.); Fasir 47'; Milovanović 72'; Abdulla 90+2'	Report

17 June 2014 2	Club Eagles	6–1	Mahibadhoo SC	National Football Stadium, Malé
16:00	Rasheed 4', 26'; Nooman 42'; Easa 71', 88' (pen.), 90+1'	Report	55' Junaid

18 June 2014 3	Club Valencia	0–0	Victory Sports Club	National Football Stadium, Malé
16:00		Report

19 June 2014 4	Maziya S&RC	2–2	BG Sports Club	National Football Stadium, Malé
16:00	Naumov 60'; Ashad 80'	Report	30', 90+3' (pen.) Atapa

22 June 2014 5	Club All Youth Linkage	1–2	Mahibadhoo SC	National Football Stadium, Malé
16:00	Misbah 82'	Report	37' Risham; 55' Junaid

23 June 2014 6	New Radiant SC	3–0	Victory Sports Club	National Football Stadium, Malé
16:00	Fazeel 14'; Dibi 57'; Hamza 90+1'	Report

24 June 2014 7	Maziya S&RC	4–1	Club Valencia	National Football Stadium, Malé
16:00	Samdhooh 11'; Assadhulla 21', 45+1'; Naumov 72'	Report (in Dhivehi)	23' A. Rilwan

25 June 2014 8	BG Sports Club	1–3	Club Eagles	National Football Stadium, Malé
16:00	Atapa 56'	Report (in Dhivehi)	42' Adhuham; 69' Thasneem; 90' Easa

2 July 2014 9	Club All Youth Linkage	0–4	Club Eagles	National Football Stadium, Malé
22:00		Report	19' Thasneem; 26' Adhuham; 48' Easa; 58' Muñoz

3 July 2014 10	BG Sports Club	1–2	Club Valencia	National Football Stadium, Malé
22:00	Ashfan 77' (pen.)	Report	44' Y. Rameez; 47' A. Rilwan

6 July 2014 11	Maziya S&RC	5–1	Victory Sports Club	National Football Stadium, Malé
22:00	Ashad 29'; Irufan 44'; Naumov 53'; Nashid 75'; Assadhulla 77'	Report	24' (pen.) Victor

7 July 2014 12	New Radiant SC	4–0	Mahibadhoo SC	National Football Stadium, Malé
22:00	Fazeel 14'; Fasir 55', 84'; Mohamed 65'	Report

10 July 2014 13	Club All Youth Linkage	1–1	Club Valencia	National Football Stadium, Malé
22:00	Amir 19'	Report	44' (pen.) Muaz

11 July 2014 14	BG Sports Club	0–2	Victory Sports Club	National Football Stadium, Malé
22:00		Report	36' Victor; 79' Shimaz

12 July 2014 15	Maziya S&RC	8–1	Mahibadhoo SC	National Football Stadium, Malé
22:00	Assadhulla 19', 41', 49'; Samaam 39' (o.g.); Naumov 43', 52'; Nashid 73'; Sadin 75'	Report	66' Tahi

14 July 2014 16	New Radiant SC	4–1	Club Eagles	National Football Stadium, Malé
22:00	Milovanović 6' (pen.); Fasir 47', 89'; Fazeel 79'	Report	33' Adhuham

16 July 2014 17	Club All Youth Linkage	0–3	Victory Sports Club	National Football Stadium, Malé
22:00		Report	11', 13' Shimaz; 48' Kaka

18 July 2014 18	BG Sports Club	2–4	Mahibadhoo SC	National Football Stadium, Malé
22:00	Atapa 8'; Simhan 45'	Report	23' H. Niyaz; 30' Tahi; 54', 66' Junaid

19 July 2014 19	Maziya S&RC	1–0	Club Eagles	National Football Stadium, Malé
22:00	Nashid 71'	Report

20 July 2014 20	New Radiant SC	3–0	Club Valencia	National Football Stadium, Malé
22:00	Umair 39'; Fasir 75'; Shamweel 86'	Report

25 July 2014 21	Club Eagles	3–2	Victory Sports Club	National Football Stadium, Malé
22:00	Muñoz 35'; Ali 59' (o.g.); Muslih 78'	Report	61' Awilo; 87' Victor

26 July 2014 22	Club Valencia	3–3	Mahibadhoo SC	National Football Stadium, Malé
22:00	Haneef 30'; A. Rilwan 65'; Mahir 76'	Report	6' A. Midhuhath; 64' H. Niyaz; 89' (o.g.) Nishan

27 July 2014 23	Maziya S&RC	8–1	Club All Youth Linkage	National Football Stadium, Malé
22:00	Shiyam 7'; Assadhulla 10', 19', 24', 25'; Abu 16'; Nashid 53'; A. Niyaz 71' (o.g.)	Report	89' (pen.) Amir

28 July 2014 24	New Radiant SC	6–0	BG Sports Club	National Football Stadium, Malé
22:00	Dibi 12', 78'; Fasir 15', 67', 82' (pen.); Shamweel 87'	Report

31 July 2014 25	Mahibadhoo SC	2–3	Victory Sports Club	National Football Stadium, Malé
21:00	A. Midhuhath 58', 90+2'	Report	6', 25', 87' Shimaz

1 August 2014 26	Club Valencia	0–2	Club Eagles	National Football Stadium, Malé
21:00		Report	18' Adhuham; 48' Rasheed

2 August 2014 27	BG Sports Club	0–1	Club All Youth Linkage	National Football Stadium, Malé
21:00		Report	4' Solah

3 August 2014 28	New Radiant SC	0–1	Maziya S&RC	National Football Stadium, Malé
21:00		Report	19' Naumov

=== Round 2 matches ===
A total of 20 matches will be played in this round.

7 August 2014 29	Maziya S&RC	0–1	New Radiant SC	National Football Stadium, Malé
16:00		Report	31' (pen.) Milovanović

7 August 2014 30	Club Eagles	1–1	Victory Sports Club	National Football Stadium, Malé
21:00	Imaaz 90+2'	Report	31' Victor

8 August 2014 31	Mahibadhoo SC	3–0	Club Valencia	National Football Stadium, Malé
16:00	H. Niyaz 26', 39'; Nazeer 90'	Report

8 August 2014 32	Club All Youth Linkage	0–0	BG Sports Club	National Football Stadium, Malé
21:00		Report

11 August 2014 33	Maziya S&RC	2–1	Victory Sports Club	National Football Stadium, Malé
16:00	Irufan 58'; Abu 79'	Report	51' Victor

11 August 2014 34	New Radiant SC	2–0	Club Eagles	National Football Stadium, Malé
21:00	David 11'; Umair 32'	Report

12 August 2014 35	Mahibadhoo SC	2–3	BG Sports Club	National Football Stadium, Malé
16:00	Nazeer 46'; Midhuhath 63'	Report; Report	8' Ajuvad; 65' Haisham; 81' Ibrahim Hamdhaan

12 August 2014 36	Club Valencia	0–0	Club All Youth Linkage	National Football Stadium, Malé
21:00		Report

15 August 2014 37	New Radiant SC	1–0	Victory Sports Club	National Football Stadium, Malé
16:00	Umair 72'	Report

15 August 2014 38	Maziya S&RC	2–1	Club Eagles	National Football Stadium, Malé
21:00	Assadhulla 37'; Sadin 85'	Report	52' Thasneem

17 August 2014 39	Club Valencia	2–0	BG Sports Club	National Football Stadium, Malé
16:00	Nishan 4', 25'	Report

17 August 2014 40	Mahibadhoo SC	1–1	Club All Youth Linkage	National Football Stadium, Malé
21:00	Midhuhath 39'	Report	90' (o.g.) Yannick

21 August 2014 41	New Radiant SC	3–1	Club Valencia	National Football Stadium, Malé
16:00	David 30'; Umair 62' (pen.); Fasir 64'	Report	22' Nishan

21 August 2014 42	Maziya S&RC	2–0	Mahibadhoo SC	National Football Stadium, Malé
21:00	Amdhan 34'; Nashid 36'	Report

22 August 2014 43	Club Eagles	2–0	Club All Youth Linkage	National Football Stadium, Malé
16:00	Imaaz 12'; Easa 69'	Report

22 August 2014 44	Victory Sports Club	3–1	BG Sports Club	National Football Stadium, Malé
21:00	Shimaz 15'; Ismail 31'; Shafraz 87'	Report	73' Fazeeh

26 August 2014 45	Maziya S&RC	2–0	Club Valencia	National Football Stadium, Malé
16:00	Irufan 10'; Assadhulla 25'	Report

26 August 2014 46	New Radiant SC	4–0	Club All Youth Linkage	National Football Stadium, Malé
21:00	Milovanović 3'; Ahmed 27'; Umair 48'; Shuhail 67'	Report

27 August 2014 47	Victory Sports Club	2–1	Mahibadhoo SC	National Football Stadium, Malé
16:00	Hussain Shimaz 19', 59'	Report	75' (pen.) Tahi

27 August 2014 48	Club Eagles	1–1	BG Sports Club	National Football Stadium, Malé
21:00	Imaaz 75'	Report	33' Azzam

30 September 2014 49	Maziya S&RC	5–1	Club All Youth Linkage	National Football Stadium, Malé
16:00	Assadhulla 27' (pen.), 46'; Nashid 66'; Ashad 72'; Ziyazan 90+2' (o.g.)	Report	8' Amir

30 September 2014 50	New Radiant SC	5–1	BG Sports Club	National Football Stadium, Malé
21:00	David 35'; Umair 45'; Fasir 70', 90+3' (pen.); Milovanović 80'	Report	74' Wisham

1 October 2014 51	Club Eagles	3–1	Mahibadhoo SC	National Football Stadium, Malé
16:00	Adhuham 14'; Imaz 50'; Muslih 86'	Report	81' Midhuhath

1 October 2014 52	Victory Sports Club	2–0	Club Valencia	National Football Stadium, Malé
21:00	Awilo 80', 90'	Report

9 October 2014 53	New Radiant SC	3–1	Mahibadhoo SC	National Football Stadium, Malé
16:00	Fazeel 19'; Akram 47'; David 75'	Report	65' Junaid

9 October 2014 54	Maziya S&RC	6–1	BG Sports Club	National Football Stadium, Malé
21:00	Ashad 1', 50', 57'; Assadhulla 31' (pen.), 53', 90'	Report	71' Kudas

10 October 2014 55	Victory Sports Club	3–4	Club All Youth Linkage	National Football Stadium, Malé
16:00	Shafraz 26'; Awilo 44'; Shafeeu 56'	Report	35' Bahajath; 45' Solah; 81' Shifau; 90' Stephan

10 October 2014 56	Club Eagles	0–1	Club Valencia	National Football Stadium, Malé
21:00		Report	66' Ahmed

=== Round 3 matches ===
A total of 15 matches will be played in this round.

21 October 2014 57	Club Eagles	3–0	Mahibadhoo SC	National Football Stadium, Malé
16:00	Mubeen 26'; Yasfaad 90'; Imran N. 90+3'	Report

21 October 2014 58	Maziya S&RC	3–1	Victory Sports Club	National Football Stadium, Malé
21:00	Nashid 6'; Shifaz 20'; Assadhulla 90+1' (pen.)	Report	12' Shafraz

22 October 2014 59	New Radiant SC	2–1	Club Valencia	National Football Stadium, Malé
16:00	Hamza 82'; Fasir 90+4'	Report	86' A. Rilwan

25 October 2014 60	Maziya S&RC	6–1	Mahibadhoo SC	National Football Stadium, Malé
16:00	Ashad 2' (pen.); Yannick 39' (o.g.); Assadhulla 44' (pen.), 63', 79' (pen.), 90+2'	Report	51' Naseer

25 October 2014 61	Club Eagles	3–0	Club Valencia	National Football Stadium, Malé
21:00	Easa 28'; Imran N. 44'; Nooman 90'	Report

26 October 2014 62	New Radiant SC	1–0	Victory Sports Club	National Football Stadium, Malé
21:00	Fasir 12'	Report

31 October 2014 63	Maziya S&RC	2–2	Club Valencia	National Football Stadium, Malé
16:00	Naumov 66'; Nashid 90+5'	Report	42' Nihan; 90+3' Ahmed

31 October 2014 64	Mahibadhoo SC	3–1	Victory Sports Club	National Football Stadium, Malé
21:00	Nazeer 1'; Junaid 70'; Midhuhath 81'	Report	88' Awilo

1 November 2014 65	New Radiant SC	1–0	Club Eagles	National Football Stadium, Malé
21:00	Akram 11'	Report

4 November 2014 66	Victory Sports Club	2–0	Club Valencia	National Football Stadium, Malé
16:00	Shimaz 8'; Nihaan 70'	Report

4 November 2014 67	Maziya S&RC	1–3	Club Eagles	National Football Stadium, Malé
21:00	Amdhan 23'	Report	7', 51' Yasfaadh; 12' Easa

5 November 2014 68	New Radiant SC	6–1	Mahibadhoo SC	National Football Stadium, Malé
16:00	Fasir 6', 21', 30', 65', 69' (pen.); David 14'	Report	57' Junaid

8 November 2014 69	Club Valencia	1–0	Mahibadhoo SC	National Football Stadium, Malé
21:00	Mahir 34'	Report

9 November 2014 70	Club Eagles	4–3	Victory Sports Club	National Football Stadium, Malé
16:00	Easa 15' (pen.); Ansar 24'; Mujuthaba 53'; Muslih 46'	Report	53', 84' Kaka; 63' Awilo

9 November 2014 71	New Radiant SC	1–1	Maziya S&RC	National Football Stadium, Malé
21:00	Shifan 15'	Report	8' Ibrahim

== Season statistics ==
=== Hat-tricks ===
Player	For	Against	Result	Date
(Maldives) Ismail Easa	Club Eagles	Mahibadhoo SC	6–1	17 June 2014
(Maldives) Assadhulla Abdulla	Maziya S&RC	Mahibadhoo SC	8–1	12 July 2014
(Maldives) Assadhulla Abdulla^{4}	Maziya S&RC	Club All Youth Linkage	8–1	27 July 2014
(Maldives) Ali Fasir	New Radiant SC	BG Sports Club	6–0	28 July 2014
(Maldives) Hussain Shimaz	Victory SC	Mahibadhoo SC	2–3	31 July 2014
(Maldives) Ashad Ali	Maziya S&RC	BG Sports Club	6–1	10 October 2014
(Maldives) Assadhulla Abdulla	Maziya S&RC	BG Sports Club	6–1	10 October 2014
(Maldives) Assadhulla Abdulla^{4}	Maziya S&RC	Mahibadhoo SC	6–1	25 October 2014
(Maldives) Ali Fasir^{5}	New Radiant SC	Mahibadhoo SC	6–1	5 November 2014

^{4} Player scored 4 goals
^{5} Player scored 5 goals

== Promotion/relegation playoff for 2015 Dhivehi League ==
Pos	Team	Pld	W	D	L	GF	GA	GD	Pts	Promotion or relegation
1	BG Sports Club	3	3	0	0	12	4	+8	9	Promoted
2	TC Sports Club	3	1	1	1	19	6	+13	4	Promoted
3	Club All Youth Linkage	3	1	1	1	16	5	+11	4	Relegated
4	United Victory	3	0	0	3	2	34	−32	0	Relegated

=== Matches ===
A total of 6 matches will be played in this round. Top 2 reams will be promoted to 2015 Dhivehi Premier League and the bottom 2 teams relegated to the 2015 Second Division Football Tournament.

27 October 2014 1	BG Sports Club	3–2	TC Sports Club	National Football Stadium, Malé
16:00	Fazeeh 24'; Azzam 66'; Ibrahim Hamdhan 69'	Report (Dhivehi)	1', 16' Faisal

28 October 2014 2	Club All Youth Linkage	13–0	United Victory	National Football Stadium, Malé
16:00	Jinah 36'; Bahjath 11', 72', 81', 85', 89'; Stephan 17', 25' (pen.), 37', 53' (pen.); Adil 65'; Shifau 79'; Ziyazan 90+1'	Report (Dhivehi)

1 November 2014 3	BG Sports Club	5–0	United Victory	National Football Stadium, Malé
16:00	Naavy 26', 33'; Kudas 29', 74'; Atapa 82'	Report; Report (Dhivehi)

2 November 2014 4	Club All Youth Linkage	1–1	TC Sports Club	National Football Stadium, Malé
16:00	Stephan 43'	Report; Report (Dhivehi)	55' Nizam

6 November 2014 5	TC Sports Club	16–2	United Victory	National Football Stadium, Malé
16:00	Ibaad 9' (o.g.); Nizam 15', 23', 44', 72', 75'; Rizuwan 21'; Zaad 28'; Isaar 49', 90+3'; Yaamin I. 77', 80', 87' (pen.); Migdhad 78', 90+2'; Muaz 90' (o.g.)	Report; Report (Dhivehi)	64' Shujau; 66' M. Rilwan

6 November 2014 6	Club All Youth Linkage	2–4	BG Sports Club	National Football Stadium, Malé
21:00	Solah 6', 55'	Report; Report (Dhivehi)	8' Visaam; 10' Atapa; 90' (pen.) Ihusan; 90+4' Isham
