= 2015 Maldivian Second Division Football Tournament =

Second Division Football Tournament
- Season: 2015
- Champions: United Victory
- Promoted: United Victory

The 2015 Second Division Football Tournament was the first season under its current league division format. The season began on 24 July and ended on 14 September.

== Structure and rule changes ==
Second division was played for two rounds according to the changes brought to the 2015 season.

Round 1

- Teams play against each other once.
- Top 5 teams qualify for Round 2.
- Bottom 2 teams gets relegated to next season's Third Division.

Round 2

- Teams play against each other once.
- The team to top the league table at the end will be the champions and get promoted to next season's Dhivehi Premier League.
- Second team will qualify for the Dhivehi Premier League play-off.

Including Maldives U19 team

- As the Maldives under-19 team was included in the Second Division Football Tournament from this year onwards, this team would neither be promoted to Dhivehi Premier League even if they finished it first, nor relegated to Third Division Football Tournament if they finished at the bottom two. Thus, they would not be either qualified to play in the Dhivehi Premier League play-off.

== Teams ==
A total of 10 teams contested in the league, including six sides from the 2014 Second Division, two sides promoted from 2014 Third Division, one side relegated from 2014 Dhivehi League and Maldives national under-19 football team.

=== Teams and their divisions ===
Note: Table lists clubs in alphabetical order.

Team	Division
Club AYL	
Club MNDF	
Hurriyya	
Maldives U19
Police Club	
SC Mecano	
United Victory	
Vyansa	
TBA	
TBA	

=== Personnel ===
Note: Flags indicate national team as has been defined under FIFA eligibility rules. Players may hold more than one non-FIFA nationality.

Team	Head coach	Captain
Club AYL		
Club MNDF		
Hurriyya		
Maldives U19		
Police Club		
SC Mecano		
United Victory		
Vyansa		
TBA		
TBA		

== League table ==
Pos	Team	Pld	W	D	L	GF	GA	GD	Pts	Qualification or relegation (Note: Top five teams continue after each team have played 8 matches.)
1	United Victory (C, P)	12	8	4	0	55	8	+47	28	Promotion to Dhivehi Premier League
2	Police Club	12	7	4	1	18	7	+11	25	
3	Dhivehi Sifainge Club	12	6	4	2	42	15	+27	22	
4	Green Streets (Note: Since recreation clubs of government offices are not allowed in the Football Association of Maldives first division football tournaments, the play-off spot was given to the fourth placed Club Green Streets instead of Police Club and Dhivehi Sifainge Club.)	12	4	5	3	20	15	+5	17	Qualification to Dhivehi Premier League play-off
5	Mecano	12	3	4	5	15	27	−12	13	
6	JJ Sports	0	0	0	0	0	0	0	0	
7	Hurriya	0	0	0	0	0	0	0	0	
8	Vyansa	0	0	0	0	0	0	0	0	
9	All Youth Linkage	0	0	0	0	0	0	0	0	Relegation to Third Division

Source: V News
Rules for classification: 1) Points; 2) Head-to-head points; 3) Head-to-head goal difference; 4) Head-to-head goals scored; 5) Goal difference; 6) Goals scored.
(C) Champions; (P) Promoted
