= Mohamed Irufaan =

Maldivian footballer (born 1994)

Personal information
- Full name: Mohamed Irufaan
- Date of birth: 24 July 1994 (age 32)
- Place of birth: Thimarafushi, Maldives
- Height: 1.64 m (5 ft 5 in)
- Position: Midfielder

Team information
- Current team: New Radiant
- Number: 5

Youth career
- 2012–2013: Valencia
- 2014: Maziya

Senior career*
Years	Team	Apps	(Gls)
2012–2013	Valencia		
2014–2025	Maziya		
2025–	New Radiant	1	(1)

International career^{‡}
2012–2016	Maldives U23		
2015–	Maldives	26	(1)
- * Club domestic league appearances and goals as of 19 September 2025 ‡ National team caps and goals as of 31 March 2026

Mohamed Irufaan (born 24 July 1994) is a Maldivian professional footballer who plays as a midfielder for New Radiant and Maldives national team.

== Club career ==
Irufaan joined Valencia in 2012 and played at youth level before breaking through into the first team, in the year 2013. He later joined Maziya in the following year 2014 and won all major trophies at Maldives top fight within just three years of time.

He has also represented Maziya at the AFC Cup. In 2014, Irufaan won the Haveeru Sports Awards for the best under 21 player in the Maldives.

== International career ==
Irufaan represented and also captained Maldives at the under 23 level between the years 2012 to 2016.

He made his senior team debut for Maldives against Bhutan in the 2018 FIFA World Cup qualification match. He came in as a 74th minute substitute for Ashad Ali where they went on to win by 4–3.

Irufaan scored his first international goal on 31 March 2026 against Timor Leste during the 2027 AFC Asian Cup qualification at the National Football Stadium.

== Career statistics ==
=== International ===
As of match played 31 March 2026

Appearances and goals by national team and year
National team	Year	Apps	Goals
Maldives	2015	1	0
Maldives	2016	–	
Maldives	2017	1	0
Maldives	2018	5	0
Maldives	2019	2	0
Maldives	2020	–	
Maldives	2021	1	0
Maldives	2022	2	0
Maldives	2023	4	0
Maldives	2024	2	0
Maldives	2025	7	0
Maldives	2026	1	1
Total		26	1

Scores and results list the Maldives' goal tally first, score column indicates score after each Irufaan goal.

List of international goals scored by Mohamed Irufaan
No.	Date	Venue	Opponent	Score	Result	Competition
1	31 March 2026	National Football Stadium, Malé, Maldives	Timor-Leste	1–1	2–1	2027 AFC Asian Cup qualification

== Honours ==
Maldives

- SAFF Championship: 2018

Maziya

- Dhivehi Premier League
  - Champions (5): 2016, 2019–20, 2020–21, 2022, 2023
- Maldives FA Cup
  - Champions (2): 2014, 2022
- Maldivian FA Charity Shield
  - Champions (5): 2015, 2016, 2017, 2022, 2023
- Malé League
  - Champions (1): 2017
- President's Cup
  - Champions (2): 2015, 2023
- FAM League Cup
  - Champions (1): 2025
