= Naiz Hassan =

Maldivian footballer (born 1996)

Personal information
- Full name: Naiz Hassan
- Date of birth: 10 May 1996 (age 30)
- Place of birth: Rinbudhoo, Maldives
- Position: Forward

Team information
- Current team: Maziya
- Number: 9

Senior career*
Years	Team	Apps	(Gls)
2013	Club All Youth Linkage	4	(0)
2014–2017	T.C. Sports		
2018–	Maziya		

International career^{‡}
2015–	Maldives	40	(10)
- * Club domestic league appearances and goals as of 2 January 2016 ‡ National team caps and goals as of 12 October 2023

Naiz Hassan (born 10 May 1996), commonly known as Dhaadhu, is a Maldivian professional footballer who plays as a forward for Maziya S&RC in Dhivehi Premier League.

== Club career ==
Born in the Maldives, Naiz helped T.C. Sports Club secure promotion to the Dhivehi Premier League in 2014. After the season, he was named best player at his club. Then, after their first season in the first division, Naiz helped the club finish second and also earned player of the season awards again.

== International career ==
Naiz made his competitive debut for Maldives on 8 September 2015 against China PR. He came on as a 93rd-minute substitute as Maldives lost 3–0. He then scored his first goal for the club on 26 December 2015 in the SAFF Championship against Bangladesh. His 90th-minute goal proved to be the winner as Maldives won 3–1.

He was also instrumental in the 2018 SAFF Championship title winning team. Naiz played in all the matches of the tournament and was also the provider for the first goal in the final match against India.

== Career statistics ==
=== International ===
As of 27 March 2018

Appearances and goals by national team and year
National team	Year	Apps	Goals
Maldives	2015	6	1
Maldives	2016	6	3
Maldives	2017	5	1
Maldives	2018	1	6
Maldives	2019	5	1
Maldives	2021	5	0
Maldives	2022	4	0
Maldives	2023	5	0
Total		37	12

Scores and results list the Maldives' goal tally first.

List of international goals scored by Naiz Hassan
No.	Date	Venue	Opponent	Score	Result	Competition
1.	26 December 2015	Trivandrum International Stadium, Thiruvananthapuram, India	Bangladesh	2–1	3–1	2015 SAFF Championship
2.	10 January 2016	Shamsul Huda Stadium, Jessore, Bangladesh	Cambodia	2–1	3–2	2016 Bangabandhu Cup
3.	10 January 2016	Shamsul Huda Stadium, Jessore, Bangladesh	Cambodia	3–2	3–2	2016 Bangabandhu Cup
4.	29 March 2016	National Football Stadium, Malé, Maldives	Bhutan	3–2	4–2	2018 FIFA World Cup qualification
5.	14 November 2017	Arab American University Stadium, Jenin, Palestine	Palestine	1–4	1–8	2019 AFC Asian Cup qualification
6.	27 March 2018	National Football Stadium, Malé, Maldives	Bhutan	2–0	7–0	2019 AFC Asian Cup qualification
7.	27 March 2018	National Football Stadium, Malé, Maldives	Bhutan	4–0	7–0	2019 AFC Asian Cup qualification
8.	27 March 2018	National Football Stadium, Malé, Maldives	Bhutan	5–0	7–0	2019 AFC Asian Cup qualification
9.	27 March 2018	National Football Stadium, Malé, Maldives	Bhutan	6–0	7–0	2019 AFC Asian Cup qualification
10.	14 November 2019	National Football Stadium, Malé, Maldives	Philippines	1–2	1–2	2022 FIFA World Cup qualification
11.	22 June 2023	Sree Kanteerava Stadium, Bangalore, India	Bhutan	2–0	2–0	2023 SAFF Championship
12.	6 September 2025	Colombo Racecourse, Colombo, Sri Lanka	Sri Lanka	1–0	3–0	Friendly
13.	9 September 2025	Colombo Racecourse, Colombo, Sri Lanka	Sri Lanka	1–0	1–1	Friendly

== Honours ==
Maldives

- SAFF Championship: 2018

TC Sports Club

- Second Division: 2014
- Dhivehi Premier League runner-up: 2015, 2016, 2017
- FA Cup runner-up: 2016, 2017
- Presidents Cup runner-up: 2016, 2017
- Sheikh Kamal International Club Cup Champions: 2017

Individual

- Second Division Best Player: 2014
- Second Division Top Scorer: 2014
- Dhivehi Premier League Best Player: 2015
- Mihaaru Sports: Most Promising Player 2017
- Maldives Football Awards – Most Promising Player: 2017
