= 2014 Maldivian Second Division Football Tournament =

Second Division Football Tournament
- Season: 2014
- Champions: TC Sports Club
- Promoted: TC Sports Club
- Relegated: VB Addu
- Best goalkeeper: Tholal Hussain

The 2014 Second Division Football tournament was the 7th edition of the Second Division Football Tournament. The winners were TC Sports Club, which were awarded promotion to the 2015 Dhivehi Premier League after claiming second position in the 2015 Dhivehi League play-off.

== Final ==
23 October 2014
21:00

T.C. Sports Club	1–0	United Victory
Mustafa Abdul Kareem 45'	Report

National Football Stadium, Malé

== Awards ==
Award	Details
Best Player	Naaiz Hassan of T.C. Sports Club
Best Goalkeeper	Tholal Hussain of T.C. Sports Club
Fair play team	J.J. Sports

== Controversies ==
On 29 March 2015, Football Association of Maldives (FAM) finalized a disciplinary action against VB Addu, regarding the incident occurred during their match against TC Sports Club in September 2014. VB Addu refused to play the match after their player, Ismail Shahud Ali was sent-off in the 49th minute for using foul language on referee. After inspecting the report of match commissioner and match officials, the FAM disciplinary committee ended up deciding that VB Addu lost the match 3–0 under 26th bullet of FAM disciplinary code. Moreover, 1 point was deducted from them, with reference to the 26th bullet of FAM disciplinary code and 2nd and 12th point of FIFA disciplinary code's bullet 56. VB Addu FC was also fined by MVR 5000, while Ismail Shahud Ali was fined by MVR 1000 and banned for 4 matches.

With this deduction of a point, VB Addu dropped places to the bottom of the 2014 Second Division Football Tournament standings and got relegated to the 2015 Third Division Football Tournament, while the least positioned Vyansa automatically moved up and retained at the Second Division Football Tournament for the 2015 season.
