= 2017 Maldivian FA Charity Shield =

Maziya	Valencia
1	0
- Date: 16 February 2017
- Venue: National Football Stadium, Malé
- Man of the Match: Mohamed Umair (Maziya)
- Weather: Mostly Cloudy; 30 °C (86 °F)

The 2017 Maldivian FA Charity Shield, (commonly known as the 2017 Milo Charity Shield due to sponsorship reasons) was the 9th Maldivian FA Charity Shield, an annual Maldivian football match played between the winners of the previous season's Dhivehi Premier League and FA Cup. The game was played between Maziya, champions of the 2016 Dhivehi Premier League, and Valencia, champions of 2016 Maldives FA Cup.

This was the fifth appearance of in the Maldivian FA Charity Shield Maziya, and second appearance for Valencia. Valencia won its first edition in the year 2009, defeating VB Sports Club. Maziya made their first appearance in 2013 and has been making back to back appearances since then, winning twice; in 2015 and 2016 defeating New Radiant on both occasions.

== Match ==
=== Details ===
16 February 2017
16:00 UTC+05:00

Maziya	1 – 0	Valencia
Asadhulla 70'	Report; Commentry

National Football Stadium, Malé

Maziya	Valencia

GK	33	(Kyrgyzstan) Pavel Matiash
DF	3	(Serbia) Miloš Kovačević
DF	4	(Maldives) Amdhan Ali
DF	6	(Romania) Andrei Cordoș
DF	27	(Maldives) Gasim Samaam
MF	12	(Maldives) Ashad Ali	(yellow card) 38'
MF	8	(Slovakia) Moosa Yaamin		(substituted off) 22'
MF	37	(Maldives) Mohamed Umair
FW	10	(Serbia) Aleksandar Rakić	(yellow card) 32'
FW	7	(Maldives) Ahmed Imaz		(substituted off) 84'
FW	9	(Maldives) Asadhulla Abdulla (c)
Substitutes:
MF	21	(Maldives) Yasfaadh Habeeb		(substituted on) 22'
MF	5	(Maldives) Mohamed Irufaan		(substituted on) 84'
Coach:
(North Macedonia) Marjan Sekulovski

GK	22	(Maldives) Mohamed Faisal
DF	3	(Maldives) Mohamed Sifan
DF	26	(Maldives) Shafiu Ahmed
DF	13	(Maldives) Mohamed Thashmeen		(substituted off) 46'
DF	17	(Nigeria) Chizi Kaka Chinda
MF	4	(Maldives) Ahmed Visam
MF	8	(Maldives) Yoosuf Rameez
MF	10	(Maldives) Hussain Nihan
MF	15	(Nigeria) Prince Chinonye
FW	9	(Nigeria) Godfrey West Omodu
FW	7	(Maldives) Ahmed Rilwan	(yellow card) 75'	(substituted off) 77'
Substitutes:
FW	12	(Maldives) Ibrahim Hamdhan		(substituted on) 46'
FW	18	(Maldives) Ali Hamdhan		(substituted on) 77'
Coach:
(Maldives) Ahmed Mujuthaba

Man of the match

- Mohamed Umair (Maziya)

Match rules

- 90 minutes.
- Penalty shoot-out if scores still level.
- Maximum of three substitutions.

== See also ==
- 2016 Dhivehi Premier League
- 2016 Maldives FA Cup
- Pre match talks by Maziya In Dhivehi - Mihaaru Sports
- Pre match talks by Valencia In Dhivehi - Mihaaru Sports
- Post match talks by Maziya In Dhivehi - Mihaaru Sports
- Post match talks by Valencia In Dhivehi - Mihaaru Sports
- Photo Gallery Sun Online
