= David Carmona =

David Carmona may refer to:

- David Carmona (footballer, born 1984), Spanish footballer
- David Carmona (footballer, born 1997), Spanish footballer
