= Gerardo Reyes =

Gerardo Reyes may refer to:

- Gerardo Reyes (actor) (1935–2015), Mexican actor
- Gerardo Reyes (journalist) (born 1958), Colombian journalist
- Gerardo Reyes (baseball) (born 1993), Mexican baseball player
- Gerardo Reyes (footballer) (born 1998), Spanish footballer

== See also ==
- Geraldo Reyes, American politician
