= 2022 Maldivian Second Division Football Tournament =

Second Division
- Season: 2022
- Dates: 10 December – TBA
- Champions: Buru Sports Club
- Promoted: Buru Sports Club^{1}

Statistics of Second Division Football Tournament in the 2022 season.

== Teams ==
A total of sixteen teams were to compete in the league. Teams are divided into two groups. Club Only One Opportunity withdrew after the draw and tournament was played with fifteen teams.

== Group stage ==
From each group, the top two teams will be advanced for the Semi-finals.

All times listed are Maldives Standard Time. UTC+05:00

Key to colors in group tables
Teams that advance to the semi-finals: Group winners; Group runners-up

=== Group 1 ===
Team	Pld	W	D	L	GF	GA	GD	Pts
Buru Sports Club	7	7	0	0	23	2	+21	21
Kudahenveiru United	7	5	0	2	24	8	+16	15
Tent Sports Club	7	5	0	2	17	4	+13	15
Club P.K.	7	4	0	3	11	12	−1	12
J.J. Sports Club	7	3	0	4	14	15	−1	9
Dhivehi Sifainge Club	7	2	0	5	6	10	−4	6
Biss Buru Sports	7	2	0	5	11	23	−12	6
Capital City Sports Club	7	0	0	7	1	33	−32	0

=== Group 2 ===
Team	Pld	W	D	L	GF	GA	GD	Pts
Club Teenage	6	4	1	1	20	5	+15	13
New Radiant SC	6	4	1	1	21	10	+11	13
L.T. Sports Club	6	4	1	1	15	7	+8	13
Victory Sports Club	6	3	1	2	11	8	+3	10
B.G. Sports Club	6	2	1	3	6	8	−2	7
Mahibadhoo SC	6	1	1	4	8	19	−11	4
Lorenzo Sports Club	6	0	0	6	2	26	−24	0

== Semi-finals ==
14 August 2022
16:00

Buru Sports Club	1–1	New Radiant SC
	Report (in Dhivehi)
Penalties
	4–3

National Football Stadium, Malé
14 August 2022
21:00

Club Teenage	0–0	Kudahenveiru United
	Report (in Dhivehi)
Penalties
	4–1

National Football Stadium, Malé

== Final ==
Both finalists are eligible for the 2023 Dhivehi Premier League play-off.

17 August 2022
21:00

Buru Sports Club	4–0	Club Teenage
	Report (in Dhivehi)

National Football Stadium, Malé

== Awards ==
Award	Details
Best Player	Stefan Đurić (Buru Sports Club)
Best Goalkeeper	Mohamed Hassan Abdel Hamid (Club Teenage)
Fair Play Team	Club Teenage

== Notes ==
1. Buru Sports Club gained promotion to the 2023 Dhivehi Premier League via 2023 Dhivehi Premier League play-off.
