= Sean Bateau =

Trinidadian footballer

- With B.G. Sports Club in 2015

Personal information
- Date of birth: 27 September 1986 (age 40)
- Place of birth: Port of Spain, Trinidad and Tobago
- Height: 6 ft 2 in (1.88 m)
- Positions: Central defender; defensive midfielder

Youth career
- 2006–2011: College of Charleston
- 2008: Atlanta Silverbacks U23's
- 2010: FC Jax Destroyers

Senior career*
Years	Team	Apps	(Gls)
2012	Charlotte Eagles	10	(0)
2013–2014	JW Rangsit FC	16	(0)
2014–2015	Stallion FC	22	(5)
2015	B.G. Sports Club	19	(1)
2016	Global FC	12	(0)
2017	Central FC	18	(2)
2018	North East Stars FC	10	(0)
2018–2019	Muktijoddha Sangsad KC		

International career^{‡}
2002	Trinidad and Tobago U17	3	(0)
2005	Trinidad and Tobago U20	5	(0)
2007	Trinidad and Tobago U23	2	(0)
- * Club domestic league appearances and goals as of 15 July 2013 ‡ National team caps and goals as of 5 September 2013

Sean Bateau (born 27 September 1986 in Port of Spain, Trinidad and Tobago) is a Trinidadian footballer who last played for Bangladesh Premier League for club Muktijoddha Sangsad KC.

== Career ==
=== College and amateur ===
Sean played four years of college soccer at the College of Charleston in Charleston, South Carolina, United States of America . During his time at college, Bateau played in the Premier Development League for the clubs Atlanta Silverbacks U23's in Atlanta, Georgia and Jax Destroyers in Jacksonville, Florida.

== Professional career ==
=== Charlotte Eagles ===
Bateau signed a season long deal with United Soccer League club Charlotte Eagles in March 2012 after a successful trial and was a regular starter in defense for much of the season, helping the Charlotte Eagles to their most successful run in their US Open Cup history beating Dallas FC of Major League Soccer in the process.

=== JW Rangsit FC ===
The following season Bateau moved to Thailand and was then quickly snapped up as one of the five foreigners by Thailand Division 1 League club JW Rangsit FC.

=== Stallion FC ===
Bateau was on the move to the Philippines, to play with 2013 United Football League champion club Stallion F.C. During his time at Stallion F.C. Bateau was ever present as the team's main central defender and team captain.

=== B.G Sports Club ===
In 2015, Bateau joined the B.G. Sports Club in the Dhivehi Premier League, based in Maldives on a two-year contract as one of four elite international players. Bateau became the first Trinidad and Tobago footballer to play in the Dhivehi Premier League.

=== Global FC ===
In January 2016, Bateau returned to the Philippines at the request of 2014 United Football League Champions and 2015 AFC Cup participants Global F.C. who recognized his talents as an experienced defender from his time at Stallions F.C. Bateau contributed to keeping Global F.C. at the top of the league with Global F.C. winning the 2016 United Football League Cup and United Football League double in Philippines earning a place in the 2017 AFC Champions League qualifiers and AFC Cup.

=== Central FC ===
February 2017 Bateau joined Central FC of the TT Pro League to help in their 2017 campaign and bid to qualify for the 2018 CONCACAF Champions League an annual continental club football competition organized by CONCACAF for the top football clubs in North America, Central America, and the Caribbean.

=== North East Stars FC ===
The 2017 champions North East Stars F.C. acquired the services of Bateau for his experience and stability in the defence after his successful stint with Central FC in the 2017 Scotiabank CONCACAF League and CFU Caribbean Club Championship. Bateau was team captain of North East Stars F.C. from March 2018 until he accepted a contract with Muktijoddha Sangsad KC in the Bangladesh Premier League.

=== Muktijodhha Sangsad KC ===
September 2018 Bateau joined Bangladesh Premier League team Muktijoddha Sangsad KC.

== International career ==
Bateau played youth international football for his home country Trinidad and Tobago, representing the U-17s during the 2003 U-17 World Cup in Finland qualifying matches. Bateau also played for the U-20 in qualifying matches for the 2005 U-20 World Cup in the Netherlands. In 2007, Bateau played for the Trinidad and Tobago U-23 football team for the qualifying matches for the 2008 Olympic Games in Beijing, China.
