= 2026 Maldivian FA Charity Shield =

Maziya	New Radiant
3	3
- Maziya won 5–3 on penalties
- Date: 31 July 2026
- Venue: National Football Stadium, Malé
- Man of the Match: Ilan (Maziya)
- Referee: Mohamed Javiz
- Attendance: 1,450

The 2026 Maldivian FA Charity Shield, is the 16th Maldivian FA Charity Shield, an annual Maldivian football match played between the winners of the previous season's Dhivehi Premier League and FA Cup. It was contested by Maziya, champions of the 2025–26 Dhivehi Premier League, and New Radiant, winners of the 2026 Maldives FA Cup.

Maziya retained the trophy they won in 2025, winning 5–3 on penalties.

== Match details ==
31 July 2026
21:00 UTC+05:00

Maziya	3–3	New Radiant
Ilan 43', 65'; Mahudhee 51'	Report	4', 45+2' Dori; 36' Fasir
Penalties
Ilan (penalty scored); Aiham (penalty scored); Aisam (penalty scored); Aidh (penalty scored); Haisham (penalty scored)	5–3	(penalty scored) Dori; (penalty missed) Naim; (penalty scored) Yaamin; (penalty scored) Ahmed Abdulla

National Football Stadium, Malé
Attendance: 1,450
Referee: Mohamed Javiz

Maziya	New Radiant
