= Toshiya Hosoe =

Japanese footballer (born 1991)

Personal information
- Date of birth: June 8, 1991 (age 35)
- Place of birth: Japan
- Height: 1.78 m (5 ft 10 in)
- Position: Midfielder

Youth career
- 2006–2007: Chukyo University
- Kuala Lumpur Youth Soccer

Senior career*
Years	Team	Apps	(Gls)
2010–2012	Melbourne Sharks		
2012–2014	Kaya	14	(0)
2014	New Young's		
2015–2016	Maziya		
2016–2017	Minerva Punjab	5	(0)
- * Club domestic league appearances and goals as of 26 November 2016

Toshiya Hosoe (細江 敏矢, Hosoe Toshiya; born June 8, 1991) is a Japanese footballer who plays as a midfielder.

== Career ==
=== Youth ===
At the age of 6, Hosoe moved to Malaysia due to his father's work.

Toshiya played for Chukyo University of Japan and Kuala Lumpur Youth Soccer of Malaysia in youth leagues. He played in Gothia Cup, where he developed as a player.

=== Club ===
==== Melbourne Sharks ====
After high school, Toshiya went on to join Victoria based Melbourne Sharks in 2011, played in Victorian State League Division 1.

==== Kaya ====
At the end of 2012 Toshiya joined Philippines UFL club Kaya FC. He stayed with Kaya for two seasons.

==== New Youngs ====
Toshiya was then signed by New Young's SC for 2014–15 Sri Lanka Football Premier League.

==== Maziya ====
Toshiya joined Dhivehi Premier League club Maziya S&RC in 2015. He featured for Maziya in six of their seven 2015 AFC Cup games.

==== Minerva Punjab ====
Toshiya was signed by Minerva Punjab FC for 2016–17 I-League season. He made his debut for the club against Mohun Bagan.

== Career statistics ==
As of 25 November 2016

Club	Season	League			National Cup		League Cup		AFC		Total		
Club	Season	Division	Apps	Goals	Apps	Goals	Apps	Goals	Apps	Goals	Apps	Goals	
Melbourne Sharks	2010–12	4			–	–	–	–	–	–			
Kaya	2013	1							–	–			
Kaya	2014	1							–	–			
New Young's	2014	1							–	–			
Maziya	2015	1							6	0	6	0	
Maziya	Minerva Punjab	2016–17	1	1	0	–	–	–	–	–	–	1	0
Career total			1	0	0	0	0	0	6	0	7	0	
