= 2017 Maldivian Second Division Football Tournament =

Tournament details
- Country: Maldives
- Teams: 9

Final positions
- Champions: Club Zefrol
- Runners-up: Kudahenveiru United

Tournament statistics
- Matches played: 19
- Goals scored: 78 (4.11 per match)

This page includes statistics of Second Division Football Tournament in the 2017 season.

== Group stage ==
From each group, the top two teams would advance to the semi-finals.

All times listed are Maldives Standard Time.

Key to colors in group tables
Teams that advance to the semi-finals: Group winners; Group runners-up

=== Group 1 ===
Team	Pld	W	D	L	GF	GA	GD	Pts
Kudahenveiru	4	4	0	0	19	1	+18	12
JJ Sports	4	3	0	1	13	4	+9	9
Da GANG	4	2	0	2	15	6	+9	6
Mahibadhoo	4	1	0	3	3	9	−6	3
Mecano	4	0	0	4	2	32	−30	0

15 April 2017
16:00

Mecano	0 – 2	Mahibadhoo
	[ Report]

Turf Ground 1, Malé
16 April 2017
16:00

Da GANG	1 – 3	JJ Sports
	[ Report]

Turf Ground 1, Malé
19 April 2017
16:00

Mecano	1 – 12	Kudahenveiru
	[ Report]

Turf Ground 1, Malé
20 April 2017
16:00

Mahibadhoo	0 – 4	Da GANG
	[ Report]

Turf Ground 1, Malé
25 April 2017
16:00

Mahibadhoo	1 – 2	JJ Sports
	[ Report]

Turf Ground 1, Malé
26 April 2017
16:00

Da GANG	0 – 2	Kudahenveiru
	[ Report]

Turf Ground 1, Malé
30 April 2017
16:00

Mecano	1 – 10	Da GANG
	[ Report]

Turf Ground 1, Malé
1 May 2017
16:00

Kudahenveiru	2 – 0	JJ Sports
	[ Report]

Turf Ground 1, Malé
5 May 2017
16:00

Mahibadhoo	0 – 3	Kudahenveiru
	[ Report]

Turf Ground 1, Malé
6 May 2017
16:00

Mecano	0 – 8	JJ Sports
	[ Report]

Turf Ground 1, Malé

=== Group 2 ===
Team	Pld	W	D	L	GF	GA	GD	Pts
Zefrol	3	1	2	0	5	3	+2	5
VK Sports	3	1	2	0	2	1	+1	5
Club PK	3	0	2	1	2	3	−1	2
BG Sports	3	0	2	1	0	2	−2	2

17 April 2017
16:00

Zefrol	2 – 2	Club PK
	[ Report]

Turf Ground 1, Malé
18 April 2017
16:00

VK Sports	0 – 0	BG Sports
	[ Report]

Turf Ground 1, Malé
22 April 2017
16:00

Club PK	0 – 0	BG Sports
	[ Report]

Turf Ground 1, Malé
27 April 2017
16:00

Zefrol	1 – 1	VK Sports
	[ Report]

Turf Ground 1, Malé
2 May 2017
16:00

Zefrol	2 – 0	BG Sports
	[ Report]

Turf Ground 1, Malé
4 May 2017
16:00

Club PK	0 – 1	VK Sports
	[ Report]

Turf Ground 1, Malé

== Semi-finals ==
10 May 2017
16:00

Kudahenveiru	2 – 2 (a.e.t.)	VK Sports
	[ Report]
Penalties
	4 – 3

National Football Stadium, Malé
10 May 2017
21:00

Zefrol	5 – 3	JJ Sports
	[ Report]

National Football Stadium, Malé

== Final ==
14 May 2017
21:00

Kudahenveiru	1 – 4	Zefrol
Yamin 88'	Report	45+2' Rifau; 51' Abu; 57' Shathir; 90' Kadar

National Football Stadium, Malé

== Awards ==
Award	Details
Best Player	Ali Haafiz (Kudahenveiru)
Best Goalkeeper	Athif Ahmed (Zefrol)
Fair play team	Zefrol
