= Rafinha Marti =

Brazilian footballer

Personal information
- Full name: Rafael Betim Marti
- Date of birth: 23 November 1987 (age 38)
- Place of birth: São Paulo, Brazil
- Height: 1.83 m (6 ft 0 in)
- Position: Forward

Team information
- Current team: Boavista Timor Leste

Senior career*
Years	Team	Apps	(Gls)
2009–2010	Citizen AA	7	(1)
20xx–2012	Kenitra AC		
2014	SCU Torreense	2	(0)
2014–2015	New Radiant		
2015	TC Sports Club		
2019	Tun Razak	3	(0)
2019–	Boavista Timor Leste	5	(8)
- * Club domestic league appearances and goals as of 30 June 2019

Rafael "Rafinha" Betim Marti (born 23 November 1987) is a Brazilian footballer who played for Bovista Timor Leste of the East Timor club Liga Futebol Amadora.

== Maldives ==
Traded to New Radiant of the Maldivian Premier League from Portugal's SCU Torreense in 2015, Betim Marti was sacked alongside two other foreigners due to putting in what the club thought was a languorous performance in the 2015 POMIS Cup. Shortly after, the Brazilian forward joined T.C. Sports Club.
