= ADK Enterprises =

Health services

ADK Enterprises is a health care and health services provider in Malé.

== History ==
In 1994, corresponding with the opening of the second ADK pharmacy in 1990, the company decided to split into two. The medical and clinical operations were brought under ADK Enterprises Private Limited while ADK Company Private Limited concentrated on expanding the pharmaceutical operations.

ADK's pharmaceutical operations have expanded significantly over the past 17 years and it is today the largest wholesale distributor as well as retailer of pharmaceutical products in the country. Currently, ADK operates 5 pharmacies in Malé, 1 in Vilimalé and an optical showroom, with exclusive rights to advertise and sell Alcon Pharmaceuticals and Hugo Boss products in the Maldives.

ADK today represents one of the most successful, innovative and dynamic business venture in the Maldives, with a staff strength of nearly 250 and a business turnover of over US$4 million.

ADK Company Pvt. Ltd., the first of the Group's companies was registered in March 1988. In 1992 the service was named ADK Medical Center.

Address:Sosun Magu, Male, 20–06, Maldives
