= 2012 Maldivian Second Division Football Tournament =

Second Division Football Tournament
Tournament details
- Country: Maldives
- Teams: 10

Final positions
- Champions: BG Sports Club
- Runners-up: United Victory

These are statistics of the Second Division Football Tournament in the 2012 season. According to the FAM Calendar 2012, Second Division Football Tournament was to start on 22 May.

== Teams ==
Ten teams competed in the 2012 Second Division Football Tournament, and these teams were divided into two groups of five.

Group 1	Group 2
United Victory; Club Riverside; Red Line Club; LT Sports; BG Sports Club	Hurriyya Sports Club; JJ Sports Club; Club Gaamagu; Sports Club Mecano; Club Zefrol

== Group stage round ==
From each group, the top two teams advanced for the league round.

=== Group 1 ===
United Victory and BG Sports Club advanced to the league round as the top two teams of the group.

=== Group 2 ===
Hurriyya SC and Sports Club Mecano advanced to the league round as the top two teams of the group.

== League round ==
The top two teams from each group qualified to compete in this round. As a total of four teams would play in this round of the tournament, the top two teams from this round advanced to the final. The top two teams of this round would also play in the playoff for the 2013 Dhivehi League. United Victory and B.G. Sports Club claimed the first and second position to advance to the final.

Pos	Team	Pts	Qualification
1	United Victory	7	Playoff & Final
2	BG Sports Club	6	Playoff & Final
3	Hurriyya SC	4	
4	SC Mecano	0	

^{*}Source: Haveeru Online

== Final ==
5 July 2012	United Victory	0–8	BG Sports Club	Rasmee Dhandu Stadium, Malé
16:00		Report (by FAM); Report (in English); Report (in Dhivehi)	2' (o.g.) Karam Mohamed; 6', 85' Channa Ediri Bandanage; 10', 44', 46' Ali Shaheem; 32', 51' Ali Shinaz

== Awards ==
Award	Details
Best Player	Ali Shaheem of BG Sports Club
Best Goalkeeper	Ahmed Areesh of Hurriyya SC
Fair Play Team	BG Sports Club
