= David Carmona (footballer, born 1984) =

Spanish footballer (b. 1984)

Personal information
- Full name: Manuel David Carmona Escobedo
- Date of birth: 12 July 1984 (age 42)
- Place of birth: Córdoba, Spain
- Height: 1.78 m (5 ft 10 in)
- Position: Winger

Youth career
- Córdoba

Senior career*
Years	Team	Apps	(Gls)
- Córdoba B
2002–2003	Córdoba	2	(0)
2004–2005	Valencia B		
2005	Pozoblanco		
2005–2007	Extremadura	52	(4)
2007	Alcorcón	9	(2)
2007–2008	Alcalá	25	(0)
2008–2009	Villanueva	21	(8)
2009	Villanovense	2	(0)
2009–2010	Badajoz		
2010	Peñarroya	18	(8)
2010–2011	Don Benito		
2011–2012	Villaralbo		
2013	Puertollano	0	(0)
2013	Atlético Mancha Real	15	(1)
2013	Pozoblanco	7	(0)
2014	Azuaga		
2014–2015	New Radiant		
2015	Ceuta		
2015	B.G Sports		
2015–2016	Atlético Espeleño	14	(3)
2016–2018	Ciudad Lucena	60	(21)
2018–	Atlético Espeleño	28	(5)
- * Club domestic league appearances and goals as of 1 May 2019

Manuel David Carmona Escobedo (born 12 July 1984) is a Spanish footballer who plays for CA Espeleño as a left winger.

== Club career ==
=== Maldives ===
Reaching a deal with New Radiant as the 2014 Dhivehi League got underway, Carmona supplied two goals and two assists on debut, helping them go top of the table. Comparing the Maldivian league to the Segunda Division B, the Spaniard claimed that teams there tended to be more conservative, scooping up the 2014 Best Foreign Player Award as well as the league title and President's Cup that year before swapping clubs for BG Sports.

Discussing his season in the Maldives, he revealed that it felt more stable there and was tired of the situation in Spain with the lower tiers, where he earned less; he also added that there were almost no fans present at games, the more popular sport being cricket. Despite this, the former Cordoba CF reserve stated that his time with New Radiant left an indelible mark on his career.
