= 2011 Third Division Football Tournament =

Third Division Football Tournament
Tournament details
- Country: Maldives
- Teams: 41

Final positions
- Champions: Club Zefrol
- Runners-up: BG Sports Club

The Third Division Football Tournament for the 2011 season in the Maldives started on October 17, 2011.

== Tournament format ==
The 41 teams first play a knockout phase. The top 8 teams in the first round advance to the second round. The 8 teams are divided into 2 groups of 4 teams in each group. The top 2 teams from each group play in the semi-final. The winner of both groups compete in the first semi. Winner of first semi is in the final, while the loser plays in the third semi. The second semi is played between the runners-up of both groups. The winner of second semi faces the loser of the first semi in the third semi, while the loser of second semi is eliminated from the tournament. The third semi is played between the loser of the first semi and the winner of the second semi. The winner of the third semi is the second team to play in the final of the tournament.

== Final ==
14 December 2011	BG Sports Club	1–1 (4–5 p)	Club Zefrol	FAM No: 1 Turf pitch, Malé
16:00		(in Dhivehi)

== Awards ==
All the awards were given by the Maldives national football team coach István Urbányi.

Award	Details
Best Player	Ahmed Shamaau of BG Sports Club
Best Goalkeeper	Moosa Fathuhy of BG Sports Club
Fair Play Team	BG Sports Club
