= Ibrahim Hamdhaan =

Maldivian footballer (born 1990)

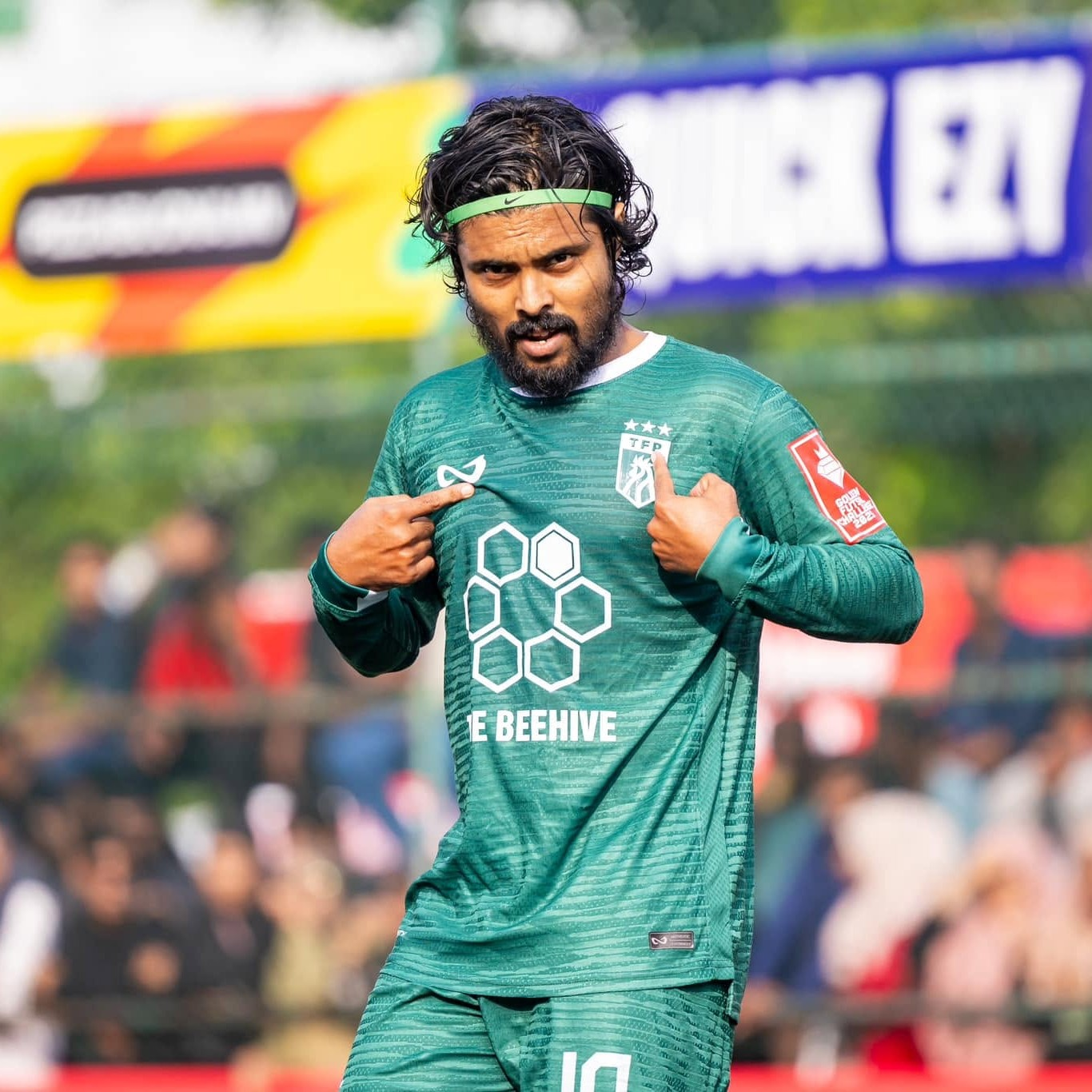

Personal information
- Full name: Ibrahim Hamdhaan
- Date of birth: September 9, 1990 (age 36)
- Place of birth: Thimarafushi, Maldives
- Positions: Forward; attacking midfielder

Senior career*
Years	Team	Apps	(Gls)
2011 - 2013	Club Valencia	54	(11)
2014 - 2016	BG Sports	59	(13)
2017 - 2017	Club Valencia	18	(11)
2018 - 2018	Victory SC	14	(10)
2022 - 2022	New Radiant SC	6	(3)
2023 - 2023	Lagoons SC	4	(4)
2026 - 2026	Lorenzo Sports Club	8	(3)
Total		152	(48)
- * Club domestic league appearances and goals

Ibrahim Hamdhaan (born 9 September 1990) is a Maldivian footballer who has played as a forward or attacking midfielder, most notably for Club Valencia in the Dhivehi Premier League and in AFC Cup Qualifiers.

== Club career ==
=== Club Valencia (2016/2017) ===
In the preliminary round of the 2017 AFC Cup qualifying playoffs, Ibrahim Hamdhaan played a key role for Club Valencia, scoring in their 3–0 aggregate win over Bhutan's Thimphu City. His pace and attacking threat alongside Ahmed Rilwan were specifically highlighted by ESPN, which noted that "strikers Hamdhaan Ibrahim and Ahmed Rilwan scored in the tie against Thimpu City and possess enough pace to trouble the best defences on their day". This performance helped set up the subsequent playoff tie against Mohun Bagan.

Maldives FA Cup

== Football Career Statistics ==
=== Club ===
As of Match Played 14 July 2026.

=== Club ===
Appearances and goals by club, season and competition
Club	Season	League				FA Cup		President's Cup		Continental		Total	
Club	Season	Division	Apps	Assist	Goals	Apps	Goals	Apps	Goals	Apps	Goals	Apps	Goals
Club Valencia	2011	Dhivehi League	19	1	3	1	0	—	—	—	—	20	3
Club Valencia	2012	Dhivehi League	14	1	3	1	0	—	—	—	—	15	3
Club Valencia	2013	Dhivehi League	19	1	3	—	—	—	—	—	—	19	3
Club Valencia total			52	3	9	2	0	0	0	0	0	54	11
BG Sports Club	2014	Dhivehi League	17	1	2	—	—	—	—	—	—	17	2
BG Sports Club	2015	Dhivehi Premier League	16	1	4	—	—	3	1	—	—	19	5
BG Sports Club	2016	Dhivehi Premier League	21	2	5	—	—	2	1	—	—	23	6
BG Sports Club total			54	4	11	0	0	5	2	0	0	59	13
Club Valencia	2017	Malé League	14	1	2	—	—	—	—	—	—	18	10
Club Valencia	2017	AFC Champions League	—	—	—	—	—	—	—	4 (Note: Appearances in AFC club competition qualifying matches.)	1	4	1
Victory Sports Club	2018	Malé League	14	1	3	—	—	—	—	—	—	14	10
Male' League Total			32	3	6	2	0	0	0	0	0	36	11
JJ Sports Club	2020	Second Division	4	1	2	—	—	—	—	—	—	4	—
New Radiant	2022	Second Division	2	1	—	—	—	—	—	—	—	6	—
Club Lagoons	2023/24	Second Division	4	1	2	—	—	—	—	—	—	4	—
Lorenzo Sports Club	2025/26	Second Division	8	1	2	—	—	—	—	—	—	8	2
Second Division Total			18	4	6	—	—	—	—	—	—	22	2
Career total			152	13	31	3	—	5	2	—	—	171	48

== Futsal Career Statistics ==
Club	Season	Club Maldives			Club	Season	Kings Cup		Total	
Club	Season	Apps	Goals	MOTM	Club	Season	Apps	Goals	Apps	Goals
BML	2021	3			FYSDA	2026	3		6	
BML	2022	3	4	2					3	4
BML	2023	6	5	1					6	5
BML	2025	4							4	
BML	2026	4	4						4	4
	Total	20	13	3			3	1	23	13

Club	Season	Division	HAF Islanders Cup			
Club	Season	Division	Apps	Goals	MOTM	RESULT
TFP	2015	National	7	12	3	Champion
TFP	2016	National	7	5	2	Runner-up
TFP	2017	National	7	10	1	3rd Place
TFP	Total		21	27	6	

As of Match Played 14 July 2026.

Club	Season	Division	Golden Futsal Challenge		
Club	Season	Division	Apps	Goals	MOTM
TFP	2015	National	6	—	2
TFP	2016	National	5	13	3
TFP	2017	National			
TFP	2018	National			
TFP	2019	National			
TFP	2022	National			
TFP	2023	National			
TFP	2024	National			
TFP	2025	National			
TFP	2026	National			
TFP	Total		11	13	5

Club	Season	Division	FAM Futsal Championship	
Club	Season	Division	Apps	Goals
TFS	2026	National	3	1
TFS	Total		3	1

== Honours ==
1. HAF Islanders Cup 2014
  1. 1 MOTM
2. HAF Islanders Cup 2015
