= Gerardo Reyes (footballer) =

Spanish footballer (born 1988)

Personal information
- Full name: Gerardo Jiménez Reyes
- Date of birth: 23 June 1988 (age 38)
- Place of birth: Madrid, Spain
- Height: 1.80 m (5 ft 11 in)
- Position: Forward

Team information
- Current team: Torre Levante

Youth career
- Valencia

Senior career*
Years	Team	Apps	(Gls)
2007–2008	Comarca Níjar B	2	(2)
2008–2009	Comarca Níjar	24	(4)
2009–2010	Arroyo		
2010–2011	La Roda		
2011	Villarrubia		
2011–2012	Requena		
2012–2013	Burjassot		
2013–2014	Catarroja		
2014–2015	Paterna	39	(15)
2015	Eagles		
2016	Atlético Saguntino	14	(6)
2016–2017	Torre Levante	38	(19)
2017–2018	Envigado	17	(1)
2018–	Torre Levante	12	(6)
- * Club domestic league appearances and goals as of 09:08, 2 May 2018 (UTC)

Gerardo Jiménez Reyes (born 23 June 1988) is a Spanish footballer who plays for Torre Levante as a forward.

== Career ==
Born on 23 June 1988 in Madrid, Reyes is a graduate of Valencia's youth setup. He went on to play for lower league clubs in Spain, starting with the B-team of Comarca Níjar in 2007, before being promoted to the senior squad the following year. He also represented Arroyo, La Roda, Villarrubia, Requena, Burjassot, Catarroja and Paterna. While at Paterna, he scored two hat-tricks. On 7 January 2015, he scored his first hat-trick for the club in a 3–1 victory against Alzira. His second hat-trick came on 18 January 2015, in a 3–2 victory against Utiel.

In 2015, Reyes moved abroad for the first time and joined Maldivian club Eagles. In the following year, he returned to Spain and signed for Tercera División club Atlético Saguntino. On 13 July 2016, he moved to SC Torre Levante of the same tier.

On 12 June 2017, Reyes joined Colombian club Envigado. He made his league debut on 8 July in a 4–2 defeat against Deportivo Cali.

== Statistics ==
As of match played on 22 April 2018

Club	Season	League			Cup		Other		Total	
Club	Season	Division	Apps	Goals	Apps	Goals	Apps	Goals	Apps	Goals
Comarca Níjar	2008–09	Tercera División	24	4	0	0	—		24	4
Paterna	2014–15	Tercera División	39	15	0	0	—		39	15
Atlético Saguntino	2015–16	Tercera División	14	2	0	0	2 (Note: Appearances in Promotion Play-offs)	0	16	2
Torre Levante	2016–17	Tercera División	38	19	0	0	—		38	19
Envigado	2017	Categoría Primera A	17	1	0	0	—		17	1
Torre Levante	2017–18	Tercera División	12	6	0	0	—		12	6
Career total			144	47	0	0	2	0	146	47
