= Ahmed Zaad =

Maldivian footballer

Personal information
- Full name: Ahmed Zaad
- Date of birth: 18 January 1988 (age 38)
- Place of birth: Maldives
- Position: Midfielder

Team information
- Current team: Club Valencia
- Number: 44

Senior career*
Years	Team	Apps	(Gls)
–2009	Kalhaidhoo ZJ		
2009	Club Valencia	5	(0)
2012	Vyansa	14	(1)
2013	BG Sports Club	18	(0)
2014–2015	TC Sports Club		
2016–2018	Club Eagles		
2017	→ TC Sports Club (loan)		
2020	Kuda Henveiru	3	(1)
2020–	Club Valencia	4	(0)

International career
2013–	Maldives	7	(0)
- * Club domestic league appearances and goals

Ahmed Zaad is a Maldivian footballer, who is currently playing for Club Valencia in Dhivehi Premier League.

== International career ==
Zaad made his debut for the Maldives' senior team in a friendly match against Pakistan on 14 February 2013, coming on to play in the 88th minute, replacing Mohamed Arif.
