= Maldivian Idol =

Maldivian television show

- Genre: Reality television
- Created by: Simon Fuller
- Directed by: Aishath Azma Mujthaba Rasheed and Creative Director Muaviyath Anwar
- Presented by: Moosa Waseem; Aminath Maureena
- Judges: Ahmed Ibrahim (Ammadey) (season 1); Ismail Affan (season 2); Ibrahim Zaid Ali (season 1–2); Unoosha (seasons 1–2)
- Theme music composer: Julian Gingell; Barry Stone; Cathy Dennis
- Country of origin: Maldives
- Original language: Dhivehi
- No. of seasons: 3
- No. of episodes: 35

Production
- Running time: 60–120 minutes
- Production companies: FremantleMedia North America; 19 Entertainment

Original release
- Network: Television Maldives
- Release: 22 January 2016 – present

Maldivian Idol is a Dhivehi television show based on the original British format Pop Idol created by Simon Fuller's 19 Entertainment and developed by Fremantle Media. The first season premiered on 22 January 2016. On 2 May, 18-year-old Laisha Junaid from Male' was announced winner, with close contenders Shalabee Ibrahim and Mohamed Ishan coming second and third respectively. The winner was awarded a cash prize of MVR 250,000 (USD 16,213) from the organizer PSM, among a host of other prizes.

== Development ==
On 26 July 2015, Public Service Media announced their local franchise of the UK origin singing competition television series Pop Idol. On 27 August 2015, reports confirmed the news that a team from Public Service Media was working in India to prepare and gain experience by observing and discussing the procedures of the Indian Idol Junior. Back from India, the team began preparing for Maldivian Idol. Later during the year, local telecommunications company Dhiraagu was appointed as the title sponsor of the show, while Allied Insurance was appointed as the co-main sponsor of the show.

On 7 October 2015, the judges of the show, Ahmed Ibrahim, Ibrahim Ali and Unoosha were revealed along with the hosts Moosa Waseem and Aishath Maureena. The panel of judges and presenters were handpicked from a list of six candidates by FremantleMedia UK. The franchise premiered on 22 January 2015 with around 600 participants and was revealed to have four rounds; Open Audition, Theatre Round, Piano Round and Gala Round. Public voting commenced from the third round onwards, with public votes accounting for fifty percent of the results, alongside judges' votes.

Director of this show was Aishath Azma and Mujthaba Rasheed. Assistant Directors were Samhaan Hameed & Shahiya Moosa. Leading technical team: Mohamed Jinah / Ahmed Mohamed / Mohamed abdulla and Ali shafaau. Creative Director of this show was "Mua Anwar".

== Series overview ==
=== Season 3 ===
The season premiered on 15 February 2018, on Television Maldives. Moosa Waseem continued as the show's host, while Unoosha, Ahmed Ibrahim and Ismail Affan returned as judges, joined by Zara Mujthaba who replaced Ibrahim Zaid Ali, while Shaina Shareef replaced Lamha Latheef as the show's female host.
