= 2015 in Maldivian football =

Football in Maldives
- Season: 2015

Overview of the 2015 season of association football in the Maldives.

== National teams ==
=== Maldives national football team ===
==== International Friendlies ====
30 May 2014 Friendly	Maldives	0–2	Tajikistan	Malé, Maldives
21:00 UTC+5:00		Report; Play by play (English); Play by play (Dhivehi)	20' Fatkhuloev; 63' Dzhalilov	Stadium: National Football Stadium; Attendance: 10,000; Referee: Kuttiappa Prashanth (Sri Lanka)

==== 2018 FIFA World Cup qualification ====
Pos	Team	Pld	W	D	L	GF	GA	GD	Pts	Qualification	Qatar	People's Republic of China	Hong Kong	Maldives	Bhutan
1	Qatar	8	7	0	1	29	4	+25	21	World Cup qualifying third round and Asian Cup	—	1–0	2–0	4–0	15–0
2	China	8	5	2	1	27	1	+26	17	World Cup qualifying third round and Asian Cup	2–0	—	0–0	4–0	12–0
3	Hong Kong	8	4	2	2	13	5	+8	14	Asian Cup qualifying third round	2–3	0–0	—	2–0	7–0
4	Maldives	8	2	0	6	8	20	−12	6	Asian Cup qualifying play-off round	0–1	0–3	0–1	—	4–2
5	Bhutan	8	0	0	8	5	52	−47	0	Asian Cup qualifying play-off round	0–3	0–6	0–1	3–4	—
