= Maldivian FA Charity Shield =

- Founded: 2009; 17 years ago
- Region: Maldives
- Teams: 2
- Current champions: Maziya (7th title)
- Most championships: Maziya (7 titles)

Maldivian FA Charity Shield is a Maldivian football match between the Dhivehi Premier League and the Maldives FA Cup champions of the past season. The winner donates part of its cash prize to charity.

== Matches ==
Below is a list of the Charity Shield winners. If one team wins the domestic double, then league runners-up are invited as the second team.

Year	Premier League champions	Result	FA Cup winners (Note: Unless noted otherwise.)	Venue
2009	Club Valencia	2–1	VB Sports Club	Rasmee Dhandu Stadium, Malé
2010	VB Sports Club	3–2	Victory	Rasmee Dhandu Stadium, Malé
2011	VB Sports Club	4–1 (a.e.t.)	Victory	Rasmee Dhandu Stadium, Malé
2012	VB Sports Club	1–0 (a.e.t.)	Victory	Rasmee Dhandu Stadium, Malé
2013	New Radiant	3–1	Maziya	Rasmee Dhandu Stadium, Malé
2014	New Radiant	3–1	Maziya	National Football Stadium, Malé
2015	New Radiant	0–2	Maziya	National Football Stadium, Malé
2016	New Radiant	0–1 (a.e.t.)	Maziya	National Football Stadium, Malé
2017	Maziya	1–0	Club Valencia	National Football Stadium, Malé
2018	TC Sports	cancelled	New Radiant	National Football Stadium, Malé
2019	TC Sports	1–1	Foakaidhoo	Foakaidhoo Football Ground, Foakaidhoo
2019	TC Sports	3–1	Foakaidhoo	National Football Stadium, Malé
2019	TC Sports won 4–1 on aggregate			
2020	Maziya	2–3	Eagles	National Football Stadium, Malé
2021	Maziya	5–0	Valencia	National Football Stadium, Malé
2023	Maziya	2–1	Eagles	National Football Stadium, Malé
2025	Maziya	2–0	Eagles	National Football Stadium, Malé
2026	Maziya	3–3 (5–3 pen.)	New Radiant	National Football Stadium, Malé

== Winners ==
Team	Wins	Years
Maziya	7	2015, 2016, 2017, 2021, 2023, 2025, 2026
VB Addu FC	3	2010, 2011, 2012
New Radiant	2	2013, 2014
Valencia	1	2009
TC Sports	1	2019
Eagles	1	2020

== All-time scores ==
Rank	Player	Goals
1	(Maldives) Ali Ashfaq	4
2	(Maldives) Shamweel Qasim	3
3	(Maldives) Ibrahim Fazeel	2
3	(Maldives) Mohammad Umair	2
3	(Maldives) Assadhulla Abdulla	2
4	(Maldives) Ashad Ali	1
4	(Maldives) Hussain Shimaz	1
4	(Sierra Leone) Abu Desmond Mansaray	1
4	(Maldives) Ahmed Shaffaz	1
4	(Netherlands) Hüseyin Cengiz	1
4	(Maldives) Ali Umar	1
4	(Maldives) Mohamed Rifau	1
4	(Maldives) Assad Abdul Ghanee	1
4	(Maldives) Ahmed Rasheed	1
4	(Maldives) Ali Fasir	1
4	(Spain) Pablo Rodríguez	1
4	(Maldives) Ahmed Nashid	1

== Main sponsors ==
Sponsors	Years
Milo	2009–2013, 2015
Lifebuoy	2014
