= 2016 Maldivian FA Charity Shield =

Maziya	New Radiant
1	0
- After extra time
- Date: 5 April 2016
- Venue: National Football Stadium, Malé
- Man of the Match: Asadhulla Abdulla (Maziya)

The 2016 Maldivian FA Charity Shield, was the 8th Maldivian FA Charity Shield, an annual Maldivian football match played between the winners of the previous season's Dhivehi Premier League and FA Cup. Since the FA Cup did not held in 2016, the spot was given to the President's Cup winners.

It was contested by New Radiant, champions of the 2015 Dhivehi Premier League, and Maziya, winners of the 2015 President's Cup.

Maziya retained the trophy they won in 2015, winning 1–0 after extra time, with a goal from their captain Asadhulla Abdulla.

== Match details ==
5 April 2016
21:00 UTC+05:00

New Radiant	0–1 (a.e.t.)	Maziya
	Report	96' Asadhulla

National Football Stadium, Malé

New Radiant

Maziya
