= 2016 Dhivehi Premier League =

Dhivehi Premier League
- Season: 2016
- Champions: Maziya S&RC
- Promoted: Green Streets
- Relegated: BG Sports
- Matches: 84
- Goals: 214 (2.55 per match)
- Best player: Ali Fasir (TC Sports)
- Top goalscorer: Ali Fasir (29 goals)
- Best goalkeeper: Sujan Perera (Eagles)
- Biggest win: TC Sports 6–1 Victory Sports Club
- Longest winning run: 6 games Maziya S&RC
- Longest unbeaten run: 13 games Maziya S&RC
- All statistics correct as of 18 October 2016.

The 2016 Dhivehi Premier League was the second season of the Dhivehi Premier League, the top division of Maldivian football. The season began on 19 April 2015. The league was made up of the 8 clubs.

== Format ==
All eight teams play against each other in Three Round Format. Team with most total points at the end of the season will be crowned as Dhivehi Premier League champion and qualified to the AFC Cup. Top four teams qualify for the President's Cup.

== Teams ==
A total of 8 teams will be contesting in the league, including 7 sides from the 2015 Dhivehi Premier League season and one promoted from the 2015 Second Division Football Tournament.

=== Teams and their divisions ===
Note: Table lists clubs in alphabetical order.

Team	Division
BG Sports Club	Maafannu
Eagles	Maafannu
Maziya	West Maafannu
New Radiant	Henveiru
TC Sports Club	Henveiru
United Victory	Galolhu
Valencia	Machchangolhi
Victory	Galolhu

== League table ==
Pos	Team	Pld	W	D	L	GF	GA	GD	Pts	Qualification or relegation
1	Maziya (C)	21	14	5	2	48	25	+23	47	2017 AFC Cup Group Stage
2	TC Sports Club	21	13	3	5	48	25	+23	42	
3	Eagles	21	10	8	3	23	11	+12	38	
4	United Victory	21	5	8	8	18	25	−7	23	
5	New Radiant	21	6	5	10	17	25	−8	23	
6	Club Valencia	21	5	5	11	23	29	−6	20	
7	Victory	21	5	4	12	22	44	−22	19	Relegation play-offs
8	BG Sports Club	21	3	8	10	15	30	−15	17	Relegation to 2017 2nd Division

Source: FIFAMaldiveSoccer Soccerway
(C) Champions

== Season summary ==
=== Round One & Two ===
Home \ Away	BGS	EAG	VLC	MAZ	NRA	TCS	UVI	VIC
BG Sports		1–3	0–0	0–1	2–0	1–3	1–2	2–3
Eagles	0–0		0–0	1–1	2–0	0–0	0–0	3–0
Valencia	3–0	1–2		2–2	0–2	0–2	0–1	2–0
Maziya	1–0	1–0	2–1		2–0	2–1	1–1	2–1
New Radiant	0–0	0–1	1–1	2–3		1–1	1–0	0–0
TC Sports	4–1	1–2	2–3	3–2	3–0		1–1	4–1
United Victory	0–0	1–1	0–2	1–5	0–3	1–0		1–1
Victory	2–0	0–4	0–2	3–3	0–1	0–1	2–5	

Updated to match(es) played on 22 August 2016. Source: Soccerway FIFA
Legend: Blue = home team win; Yellow = draw; Red = away team win.

Note 1: The notion of home and away fixtures in the 2016 Dhivehi Premier League is moot as all games are played at National Football Stadium. As such, for the purpose of this table, the first result chronologically has been deemed that team's "home" game and the second the "away" game.

=== Round Three ===
╲ Round 3	BGS	EAG	VLC	UVI	MAZ	NRA	TCS	VIC
BG Sports		0–0	2–1	0–0	2–2	1–1	1–4	1–0
Eagles			1–0	0–0	1–2	1–0	1–0	0–3
Valencia				0–1	1–5	0–1	3–4	1–1
United Victory					0–1	2–3	1–2	0–1
Maziya						2–0	3–4	5–1
New Radiant							1–2	1–2
TC Sports								6–1
Victory								

=== Positions by round ===
The table lists the positions of teams after each week of matches.

Team ╲ Round	1	2	3	4	5	6	7	8	9	10	11	12	13	14	15	16	17	18	19	20	21
BG Sports	7										8		7	8					8	8	8
Eagles	4										2		2	2					3	3	3
Valencia	2										4		4	4					5	5	6
Maziya	3										1		1	1					1	1	1
New Radiant	6										6		6	6					6	6	5
TC Sports	5										3		3	3					2	2	2
United Victory	1										5		5	5					4	4	4
Victory	8										7		8	7					7	7	7

Updated to match(es) played on 22 October 2016. Source:

== Matches ==
=== Round 1 ===
==== Week 1 ====
19 April 2016 1	New Radiant	2–3	Maziya	National Football Stadium, Malé

19 April 2016 2	Club Valencia	3–0	BG Sports Club	National Football Stadium, Malé

20 April 2016 3	Victory	2–5	United Victory	National Football Stadium, Malé

20 April 2016 4	TC Sports Club	1–2	Club Eagles	National Football Stadium, Malé

==== Week 2 ====
4 May 2016 5	Maziya	1–0	BG Sports Club	National Football Stadium, Malé

4 May 2016 6	New Radiant	1–0	United Victory	National Football Stadium, Malé

5 May 2016 7	TC Sports Club	4–1	Victory	National Football Stadium, Malé

5 May 2016 8	Club Eagles	0–0	Club Valencia	National Football Stadium, Malé

==== Week 3 ====
17 May 2016 9	Maziya	2–1	Club Valencia	National Football Stadium, Malé

17 May 2016 10	Club Eagles	3–0	Victory	National Football Stadium, Malé

18 May 2016 11	TC Sports Club	1–1	United Victory	National Football Stadium, Malé

18 May 2016 12	New Radiant	0–0	BG Sports Club	National Football Stadium, Malé

==== Week 4 ====
12 June 2016 13	Maziya	2–1	Victory	National Football Stadium, Malé

13 June 2016 14	Club Eagles	0–0	United Victory	National Football Stadium, Malé

14 June 2016 15	TC Sports Club	4–1	BG Sports Club	National Football Stadium, Malé

15 June 2016 16	New Radiant	1–1	Club Valencia	National Football Stadium, Malé

==== Week 5 ====
19 June 2016 17	Maziya	1–1	United Victory	National Football Stadium, Malé

20 June 2016 18	Club Eagles	0–0	BG Sports Club	National Football Stadium, Malé

21 June 2016 19	TC Sports Club	2–3	Club Valencia	National Football Stadium, Malé

22 June 2016 20	New Radiant	0–0	Victory	National Football Stadium, Malé

==== Week 6 ====
26 June 2016 21	Club Valencia	0–1	United Victory	National Football Stadium, Malé

27 June 2016 22	Victory	2–0	BG Sports Club	National Football Stadium, Malé

28 June 2016 23	TC Sports Club	3–2	Maziya	National Football Stadium, Malé

29 June 2016 24	New Radiant	0–1	Club Eagles	National Football Stadium, Malé

==== Week 7 ====
3 July 2016 25	BG Sports Club	1–2	United Victory	National Football Stadium, Malé

4 July 2016 26	Victory	0–2	Club Valencia	National Football Stadium, Malé

5 July 2016 27	Club Eagles	1–1	Maziya	National Football Stadium, Malé

10 July 2016 28	New Radiant	1–1	TC Sports Club	National Football Stadium, Malé

=== Round 2 ===
==== Week 8 ====
15 July 2016 29	Victory	0–1	New Radiant	National Football Stadium, Malé

15 July 2016 30	Maziya	2–1	TC Sports Club	National Football Stadium, Malé

16 July 2016 31	BG Sports Club	0–0	Club Valencia	National Football Stadium, Malé

16 July 2016 32	Club Eagles	1–1	United Victory	National Football Stadium, Malé

==== Week 9 ====
20 July 2016 33	Victory	0–1	TC Sports Club	National Football Stadium, Malé

20 July 2016 34	BG Sports Club	0–1	Maziya	National Football Stadium, Malé

21 July 2016 35	Club Valencia	1–2	Club Eagles	National Football Stadium, Malé

21 July 2016 36	United Victory	0–3	New Radiant	National Football Stadium, Malé

==== Week 10 ====
3 August 2016 37	Maziya	3–3	Victory	National Football Stadium, Malé

3 August 2016 38	Club Eagles	3–1	BG Sports Club	National Football Stadium, Malé

4 August 2016 39	United Victory	0–2	Club Valencia	National Football Stadium, Malé

4 August 2016 40	TC Sports Club	3–0	New Radiant	National Football Stadium, Malé

==== Week 11 ====
7 August 2016 41	Club Eagles	4–0	Victory	National Football Stadium, Malé

7 August 2016 42	Maziya	2–0	New Radiant	National Football Stadium, Malé

8 August 2016 43	TC Sports Club	2–0	Club Valencia	National Football Stadium, Malé

8 August 2016 44	United Victory	0–0	BG Sports Club	National Football Stadium, Malé

==== Week 12 ====
12 August 2016 45	TC Sports Club	3–1	BG Sports Club	National Football Stadium, Malé

12 August 2016 46	United Victory	1–1	Victory	National Football Stadium, Malé

13 August 2016 47	Club Eagles	2–0	New Radiant	National Football Stadium, Malé

13 August 2016 48	Maziya	2–2	Club Valencia	National Football Stadium, Malé

==== Week 13 ====
17 August 2016 49	New Radiant	0–2	BG Sports Club	National Football Stadium, Malé

17 August 2016 50	Club Valencia	2–0	Victory	National Football Stadium, Malé

18 August 2016 51	Club Eagles	0–0	TC Sports Club	National Football Stadium, Malé

18 August 2016 52	Maziya	5–1	United Victory	National Football Stadium, Malé

==== Week 14 ====
21 August 2016 53	Victory	3–2	BG Sports Club	National Football Stadium, Malé

21 August 2016 54	Club Valencia	0–2	New Radiant	National Football Stadium, Malé

22 August 2016 55	United Victory	1–0	TC Sports Club	National Football Stadium, Malé

22 August 2016 56	Maziya	1–0	Club Eagles	National Football Stadium, Malé

=== Round 3 ===
==== Week 15 ====
25 August 2016 57	TC Sports Club	2–1	United Victory	National Football Stadium, Malé

25 August 2016 58	Club Eagles	0–0	BG Sports Club	National Football Stadium, Malé

26 August 2016 59	Maziya	2–0	New Radiant	National Football Stadium, Malé

27 August 2016 60	Club Valencia	1–1	Victory	National Football Stadium, Malé

==== Week 16 ====
14 September 2016 61	New Radiant	1–2	Victory	National Football Stadium, Malé

14 September 2016 62	Maziya	5–1	Club Valencia	National Football Stadium, Malé

15 September 2016 63	United Victory	0–0	BG Sports Club	National Football Stadium, Malé

15 September 2016 64	Club Eagles	1–0	TC Sports Club	National Football Stadium, Malé

==== Week 17 ====
19 September 2016 65	TC Sports Club	4–1	BG Sports Club	National Football Stadium, Malé

19 September 2016 66	Club Eagles	0–0	United Victory	National Football Stadium, Malé

20 September 2016 67	Club Valencia	0–1	New Radiant	National Football Stadium, Malé

20 September 2016 68	Maziya	5–1	Victory	National Football Stadium, Malé

==== Week 18 ====
24 September 2016 69	Maziya	1–0	United Victory	National Football Stadium, Malé

24 September 2016 70	Club Valencia	1–2	BG Sports Club	National Football Stadium, Malé

25 September 2016 71	TC Sports Club	2–0	New Radiant	National Football Stadium, Malé

25 September 2016 72	Club Eagles	0–3	Victory	National Football Stadium, Malé

==== Week 19 ====
29 September 2016 73	Club Eagles	1–0	New Radiant	National Football Stadium, Malé

29 September 2016 74	TC Sports Club	6–1	Victory	National Football Stadium, Malé

30 September 2016 75	Maziya	2–2	BG Sports Club	National Football Stadium, Malé

30 September 2016 76	Club Valencia	0–1	United Victory	National Football Stadium, Malé

==== Week 20 ====
16 October 2016 77	Maziya	3–4	TC Sports Club	National Football Stadium, Malé

16 October 2016 78	Club Eagles	1–0	Club Valencia	National Football Stadium, Malé

17 October 2016 79	United Victory	0–1	Victory	National Football Stadium, Malé

17 October 2016 80	New Radiant	1–1	BG Sports Club	National Football Stadium, Malé

==== Week 21 ====
21 October 2016 81	Victory	0–1	BG Sports Club	National Football Stadium, Malé

21 October 2016 82	United Victory	2–3	New Radiant	National Football Stadium, Malé

22 October 2016 83	Maziya	2–1	Club Eagles	National Football Stadium, Malé

22 October 2016 84	TC Sports Club	4–3	Club Valencia	National Football Stadium, Malé

== Season statistics ==
=== Top scorers ===
Rank	Player	Club	Goals
1	(Maldives) Ali Fasir	TC Sports	29
2	(Maldives) Asadhulla Abdulla	Maziya	19
3	(Nigeria) Godfrey West Omodu	Victory	9
4	(Maldives) Ali Nafiu	TC Sports	8
4	(Egypt) Mostafa Seddik	Victory	8
6	(Maldives) Mohamed Umair	Maziya	7
6	(Maldives) Hassan Adhuham	Valencia	7
6	(Croatia) Andrej Kerić	United Victory	7
9	(Maldives) Ali Ashfaq	Maziya	6
9	(Spain) Angel Carrasco Muñoz	Valencia	6
9	(Cameroon) Hansley Awilo Ambia	Valencia	6

=== Hat-tricks ===
Player	For	Against	Result	Date
(Maldives) Ali Fasir	TC Sports	Victory	4–1	5 May 2015
(Maldives) Ali Fasir	TC Sports	BG Sports	4–1	14 June 2015
(Maldives) Asadhulla Abdulla	Maziya	Victory	5–1	20 September 2015
(Maldives) Ali Fasir^{4}	TC Sports	Victory	6–1	29 September 2015
(Maldives) Ali Fasir	TC Sports	Valencia	4–3	22 October 2015
(Maldives) Hassan Adhuham	Valencia	TC Sports	3–4	22 October 2015

- ^{4} Player scored four goals

== 2016 Dhivehi Premier League play-off ==
27 October 2016
16:00
First Leg

Victory	4–0	Zefrol
	Report

National Football Stadium, Malé
30 October 2016
16:00
Second Leg

Victory	3–1	Zefrol
	Report

National Football Stadium, Malé
