= Ashad Ali =

Maldivian footballer

Ashadh Ali
- އަސްހަދު ޢަލީ

Minister of State for Youth, Sports and Community Empowerment
- In office 6 December 2018 – 2 February 2022
- President: Ibrahim Mohamed Solih
- Preceded by: Ali Umar

Personal details
- Born: 14 September 1986 (age 40) Malé, Maldives
- Party: Maldivian Democratic Party
- Height: 1.80 m (5 ft 11 in)
Association football career
- Positions: Forward; midfielder; defender
Team information
- Current team: Club Valencia
- Number: 12
Youth career
- Club Lagoons
Senior career*
Years	Team	Apps	(Gls)
2006–2009	Victory	15+	(7+)
2010–2012	VB Sports Club	26+	(10+)
2013	BG Sports Club	11	(6)
2013–2014	Maziya	16	(7)
2015	New Radiant	12	(4)
2016–2017	Maziya		
2018	Club Green Streets		
2021	Club Eagles		
2022–	Club Valencia		
International career
2006	Maldives U23	3	(1)
2007–2018	Maldives	52	(2)
- * Club domestic league appearances and goals

Ashad Ali (born 14 September 1986), nicknamed Adey or Adubarey, is a Maldivian footballer who played in the Dhivehi Premier League. He played for multiple local clubs during the extent of his career. He was a member of the Maldives national football team. After his hiatus from professional football, he turned towards politics serving as a state minister of youth sports and community empowerment under Ibrahim Mohamed Solih administration.

== Club career ==
Ashad started his career at Victory Sports Club. He later joined VB Sports Club before joining the newly promoted side BG Sports Club

In 2018, he signed a one-year deal with Club Green Streets.

== International career ==
=== International goals ===
Scores and results list the Maldives' goal tally first.

No	Date	Venue	Opponent	Score	Result	Competition
1.	11 December 2009	Bangabandhu National Stadium, Dhaka, Bangladesh	Sri Lanka	5–1	5–1	2009 SAFF Championship
2.	23 March 2011	National Football Stadium, Malé, Maldives	Kyrgyzstan	1–0	2–1	2012 AFC Challenge Cup qualification

== Penalty feinting incident ==
Adey gained global notability after simulating a fall prior to the run up of a penalty shootout in the third place match of the 2014 AFC Challenge Cup against Afghanistan, deceiving goalkeeper Mansur Faqiryar. The match was won 7–8 to the Maldives.

A similar move was pulled off by Thomas Müller later that year during the 2014 FIFA World Cup (Germany v Algeria). In the 88th minute, Thomas Müller deceptively stumbled while lining up the kick, before getting up and running through the Algerian wall. A few days later, Müller admitted to a German TV reporter that the free kick was a designed play.
