= B.G. Sports Club =

Association football club in Maldives

BG Sports Club
- Full name: B.G Sports Club
- Founded: 1996; 30 years ago
- Ground: National Football Stadium, Malé
- Capacity: 4,000
- Head coach: Ahmed Nashid
- League: Second Division
- 2023–24: Second Division, 7th of 15
Home colours	Away colours

B.G. Sports Club (commonly known as BG Sports, or simply as BG) is a multi-sports organization based in Maafannu, Malé, Maldives. It is best known for its football team which currently competes in the Maldivian Second Division Football Tournament.

Founded in 1996, BG Sports is also regarded as the most successful Baibalaa clubs in the country.

== History ==
=== Formation and early years (1996–2010) ===
BG Sports Club was established in 1996 by a group of neighbours in Maafannu, originally to participate in the traditional Maldivian sport Baibalaa. Later that year itself the club board quickly decided to expanded into other sports, including football, basketball, athletics, swimming, netball, cricket and more.

=== Rise to national football prominence (2011–2013) ===
BG Sports entered competitive football and rose through the lower divisions. In 2011, the club finished runner-up in the Third Division, losing the final to Club Zefrol on penalties, but still gained promotion to the Second Division.

The following year, BG Sports became 2012 Second Division champions, defeating United Victory 8–0 in the final — their biggest recorded win — and earned promotion to the First Division for the first time in their history.

In the 2013 Dhivehi League, BG Sports signed several high-profile players and finished third, qualifying for the President’s Cup for the first time. They were eliminated in the semi-final after a narrow 2–1 loss to Maziya.

=== Top-flight struggles and survival (2014–2016) ===
During the 2014 Dhivehi League, BG Sports managed only one win from 14 matches, finishing at the bottom. However, avoiding relegation by winning all three matches in the play-offs.

In 2015, when the Maldives top division was rebranded as the Dhivehi Premier League, BG Sports became one of the eight founding clubs. They finished 7th, entering another relegation play-off. BG defeated Club Green Streets 4–1 in the first leg, and after Green Streets failed to appear for the second leg, BG retained their top-flight status.

The following season, BG Sports finished bottom of the Premier League, with just 3 wins from 21 matches, resulting in relegation to the Second Division.

=== Recent years (2017–present) ===
Between 2017 and 2020, BG Sports endured difficult campaigns in the Second Division, failing to win a single group-stage match across three seasons. In 2022, they recorded their first competitive win after five years but did not progress beyond the group stage. During the 2023–24 Second Division, BG Sports advanced to the quarter-finals before being eliminated 5–0 by eventual champions Masodi Sports Club.

== Season-by-season records ==
Season	League								FA Cup	President's Cup (Note: Only First Division teams are eligible to play in President's Cup.)	Top goalscorer		Head coach
Season	Div.	Pos.	Pl.	W	D	L	GS	GA	FA Cup	President's Cup	Name	Goals	Head coach
2011	**Div 3 (3)** ↑	2nd							DNE				
2012	**Div 2 (2)** ↑	1st							DNE				
2013	**DL (1)**	3rd	19	7	3	9	19	23	QF	SF			
2014	DL (1)	8th	14	1	3	10	13	39	QF	n/a	(Nigeria) Atapa Kazeem Adeolu	6	(Maldives) Mohamed Iqbal
2015	DPL (Note: The 8 top Maldivian clubs joined the formation of Dhivehi Premier League as the new top tier of the Maldivian football pyramid.) (1)	7th	14	3	4	7	18	26	cancelled	Grp	(Spain) David Carmona	7	(Maldives) Mohamed Shazly
2016	DPL (1) ↓	8th	21	3	8	10	15	30	QF	n/a	(Nigeria) Kingsley Elechi	8	(Maldives) Mohamed Shazly
2017	**Div 2 (2)**	8th	3	0	2	1	0	2	DNE		–	–	
2018	Div 2 (2)	8th	3	0	0	3	1	11	cancelled		(Maldives) Ahmed Waheed	1	
2020	Div 2 (2)	8th	3	0	1	2	2	6	cancelled		(Maldives) Hussain Suhail (Maldives) Ibrahim Jaah Ziyad	1	(Maldives) Muaviyath Ilham
2022	Div 2 (2)	10th	6	2	1	6	3	8	DNE				
2023–24	Div 2 (2)	7th	5	2	0	3	11	12	cancelled		(Maldives) Muzdhan Hassan	4	(Maldives) Ahmed Nashid

Key to league record:

- Pld = Matches played
- W = Matches won
- D = Matches drawn
- L = Matches lost
- GF = Goals for
- GA = Goals against
- Pos = Final position

Key to divisions:

- DPL = Dhivehi Premier League
- DL = Dhivehi League
- Div 2 = Third Division
- Div 3 = Third Division
- n/a = Not applicable

Key to rounds:

- DNE = Did not enter
- Grp = Group stage
- QF = Quarter-finals
- SF = Semi-finals
- RU = Runners-up
- W = Winners

Winners	Runners-up	Third place	Promoted	Relegated

Division shown in bold to indicate a change in division.

== Honours ==
=== Domestic ===
- Second Division Football Tournament
  - Winners (1) 2012
- Third Division Football Tournament
  - Runners-up (1) 2011
