= Transport in the Maldives =

Transportation networks and infrastructure in Maldives

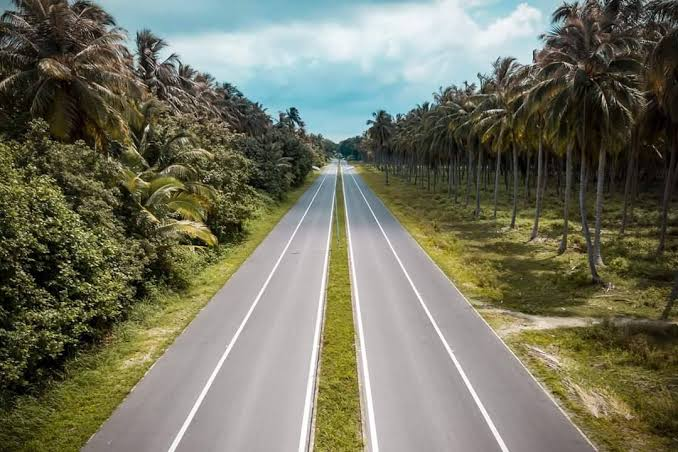
Laamu Link Road

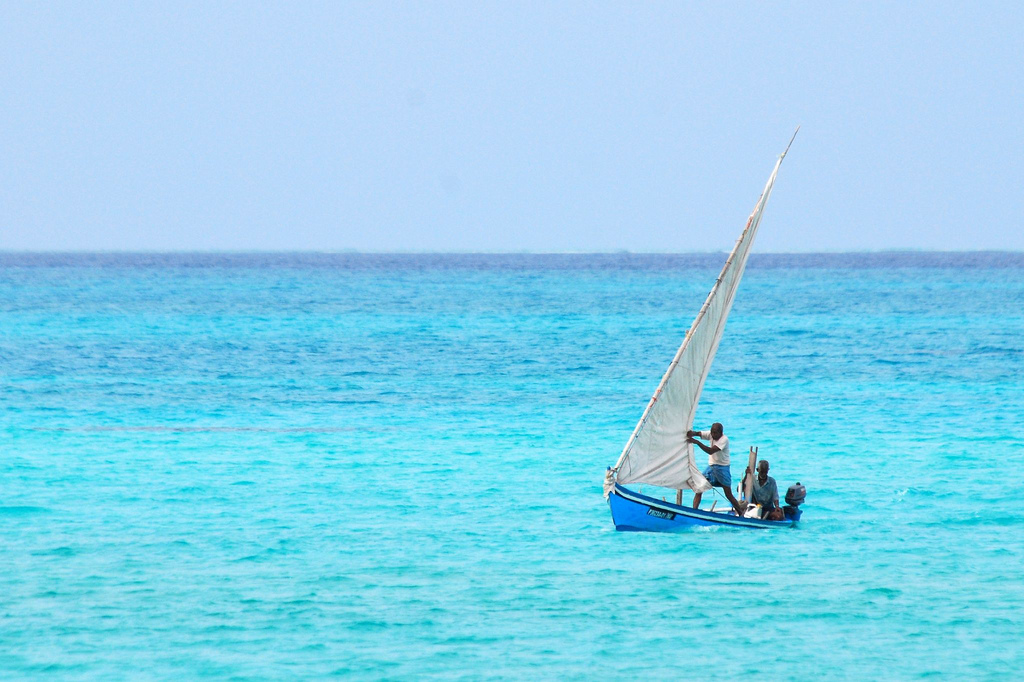
Dhoni in the Maldives

Transport in the Maldives is highly facilitated by road, bridges, highways, air and water networks. The country has no railways. Transportation in the Maldives primarily revolves around its maritime and air travel systems, given the archipelagic nature of the country, which consists of 26 atolls and over 1,000 coral islands. The absence of extensive road networks between islands necessitates a heavy reliance on boats and seaplanes for inter-island connectivity. Dhoni, traditional Maldivian wooden boats, and modern speedboats are widely used for short distances and local travel, while ferries provide regular services between inhabited islands. For longer journeys, the Maldives domestic airlines operate seaplane and airplane services that link the capital, Malé, with outlying atolls, enhancing both passenger and cargo transport across the islands.

Malé, the capital city, serves as the central hub for the country’s transportation network. Velana International Airport, located on nearby Hulhulé Island, is the primary gateway for international travel, with frequent connections to major global destinations. This airport also handles a significant volume of domestic traffic, alongside other regional airports dispersed across the atolls. For intra-city travel within Malé and its nearby islands, roads and a network of causeways and bridges facilitate movement. Notably, the Sinamalé Bridge connects Malé to Hulhulé Island, improving accessibility to the international airport. Overall, the transportation infrastructure of the Maldives is crucial for its tourism-driven economy and the mobility of its residents.

== Road transport ==
Road infrastructure in the Maldives is relatively limited due to the country's unique geography of dispersed atolls and islands. Most of the roads are found in the capital city of Malé, Hulhumalé, and a few other larger islands like Addu Atoll. The road network in Malé is characterized by narrow streets and heavy traffic congestion, reflective of the city's high population density. The Sinamalé Bridge, also known as the China–Maldives Friendship Bridge, is a significant development that connects Malé with Hulhulé Island, where the Velana International Airport is located, and the planned city of Hulhumalé. This bridge has greatly improved road connectivity and facilitated easier movement between these key areas. Outside of these urban centers, most islands rely on footpaths, bicycles, and motorcycles for local transport, with very few roads available due to the small size of the islands and the prioritization of maritime and air travel for longer distances.

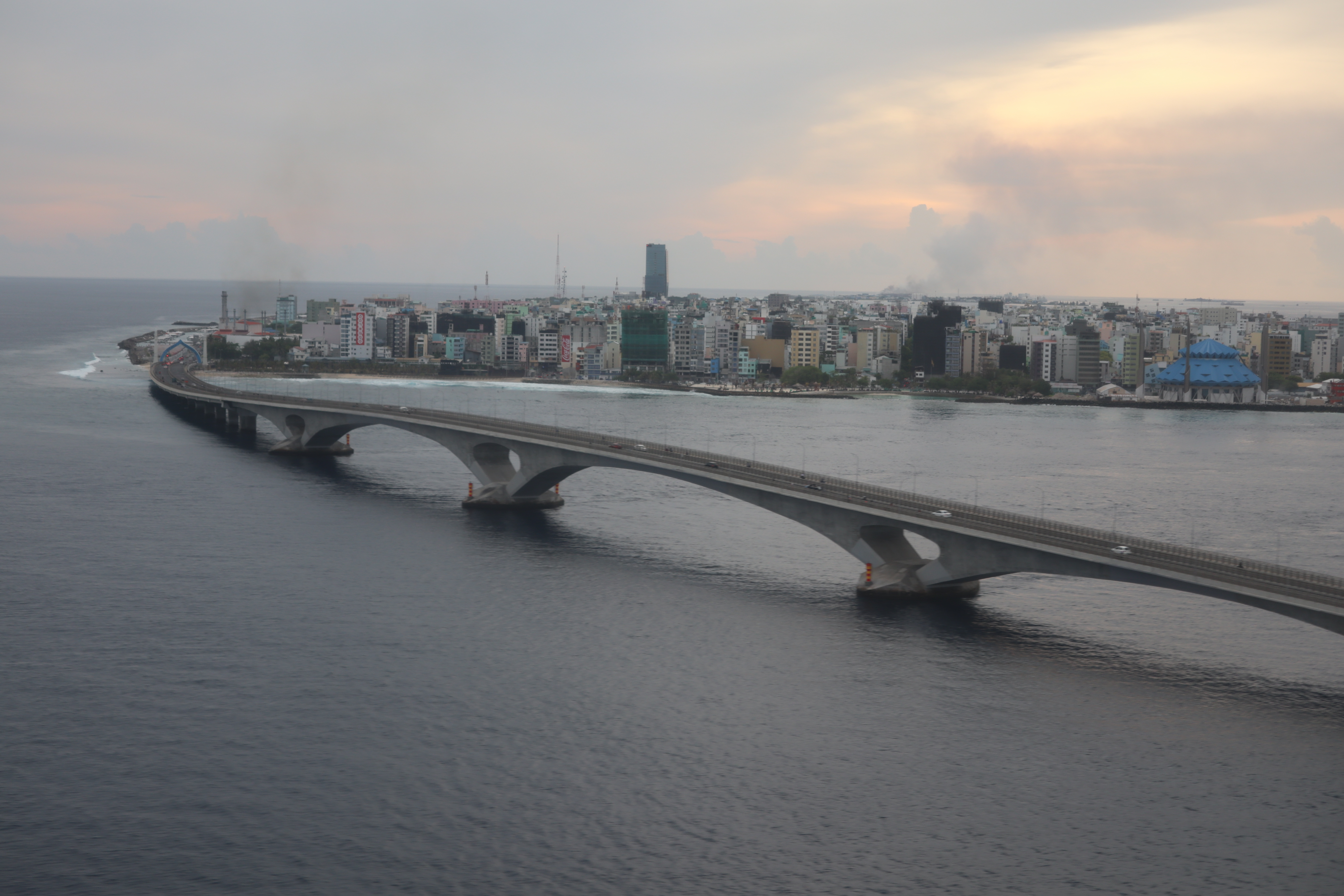
Sinamalé Bridge, first islander bridge in the Maldives

In the capital city of Malé, the majority of roads are paved with concrete cobblestones, while some are paved with tarmac. In Addu City, many roads are surfaced with tarmac. A notable feature in Aduu Atoll is a highway known as "Addu link road", connects four islands, Hithadhoo, Maradhoo, Maradhoo–Feydhoo, Feydhoo.

== Ports and harbours ==
Ports and harbors in the Maldives are crucial to the nation's economy, given the country's geographic composition as an archipelago of over 1,000 islands. In Malé city, there are several regional ports and harbors that facilitate inter-island transportation and support local economies, including Kulhudhuffushi Harbor, and Hithadhoo Regional Port. These ports handle a mix of conventional and containerized cargo, essential for importing goods and exporting local products. The development and maintenance of these maritime facilities are vital for the Maldives, ensuring the efficient movement of goods and supporting the tourism industry, which is a significant contributor to the national GDP.

Malé Commercial Harbour is the primary hub of maritime activities and commerce in the Maldives. Located in the capital city of Malé, the port offers a range of essential services including marine pilotage, wharfage, and mooring. It is equipped to handle both conventional and containerized cargo, providing facilities for cargo handling, as well as stuffing and un-stuffing services. As the main port of the Maldives, Malé Commercial Harbour plays a critical role in the nation's economy by facilitating the import and export of goods, thereby supporting the archipelago's trade and logistics infrastructure.

== Air transport ==
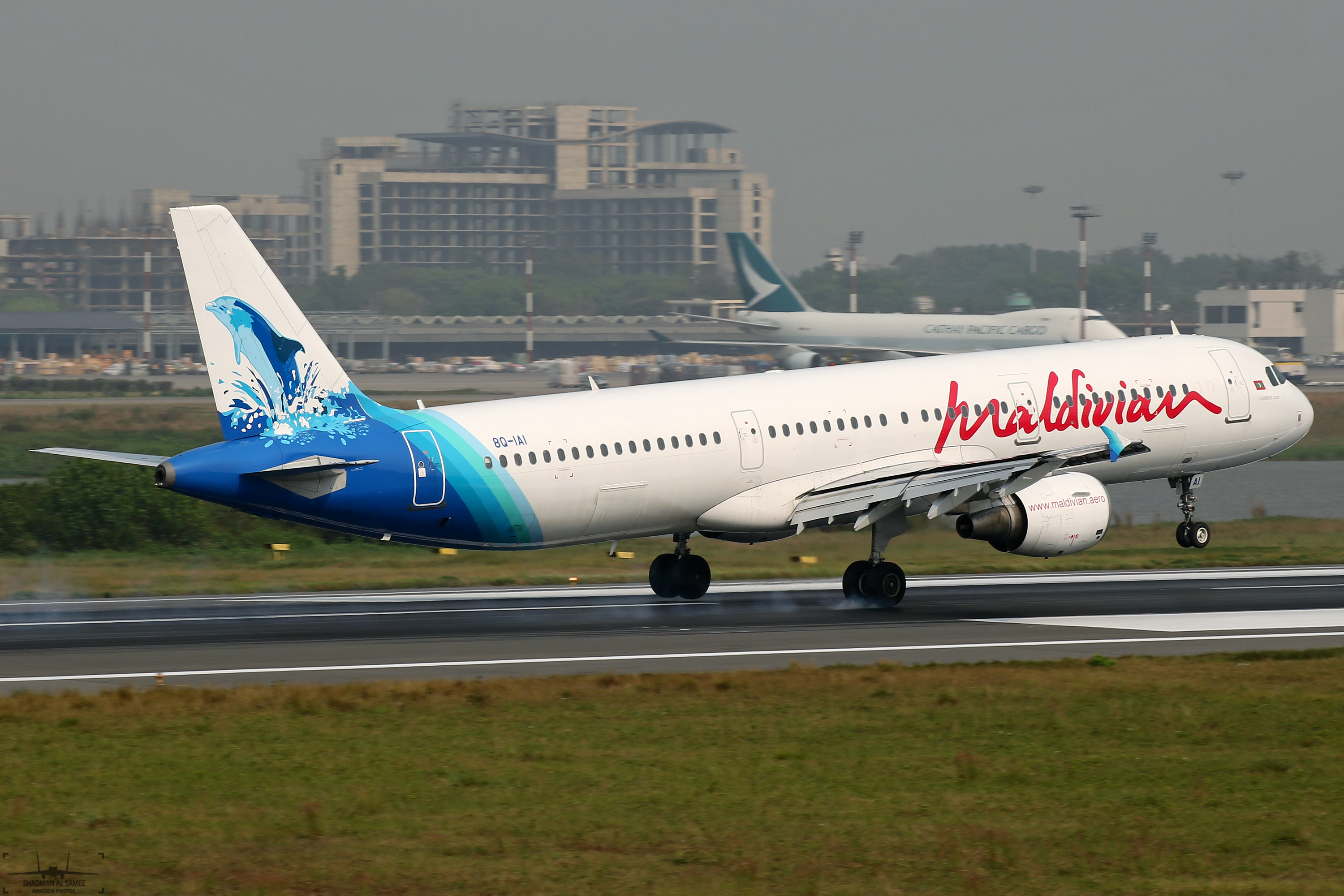
Maldivian Airbus A321

The archipelago has 18 airports. Two had paved runways. One stretched over 10,000 ft (3,000 m). Another was in the range 8,000 to 9,999 ft (2,438 to 3,048 m). Three airports had unpaved runways of 3,000 to 4,999 ft (914 to 1,524 m). Five of the 18 airports schedule international flights.

== See also ==
- List of airports in Maldives
- Velana International Airport
- Gan International Airport
- Flyme
- Maldivian
- Mega Maldives
- Trans Maldivian Airways
