= Addu City =

City in the Maldives

Addu City އައްޑޫ
- City
- Location of Addu City in Maldives

- Location in Maldives
- Coordinates: 00.6413°S 073.158°E
- Country: Maldives
- Geographic atoll: Addu Atoll

Government
  - Mayor: Ali Nizar

Area
  - Total: 15 km^{2} (5.8 sq mi)

Dimensions
  - Length: 18.3 km (11.4 mi)
  - Width: 14.7 km (9.1 mi)

Population (2024)
  - Total: 35,359
  - Density: 2,400/km^{2} (6,100/sq mi)
- Time zone: UTC+05:00 (MST)
- Website: adducity.gov.mv

Addu City is a city in the Maldives that consists of the inhabited islands of Addu Atoll, the southernmost atoll of the archipelago. Addu City is the second-largest city and urban area in the Maldives and is one of the two urban areas to have the status of "city" other than the capital city, Malé. Addu City has 6 districts. They are Hithadhoo, Maradhoo-Feydhoo, Maradhoo, Feydhoo, Meedhoo and Hulhudhoo. These divisions are naturally islands, but are well connected. In addition, Addu Atoll has other uninhabited islands.

== History ==
=== Beginnings ===
Addu is one of the oldest inhabited atolls in the country, with the Island of Meedhoo showing traces of settlement dating back to 2000 BC.

The original settlers are said to be from the western regions of Gujarat and Bihar state of modern-day India.

=== Britain's secret base ===
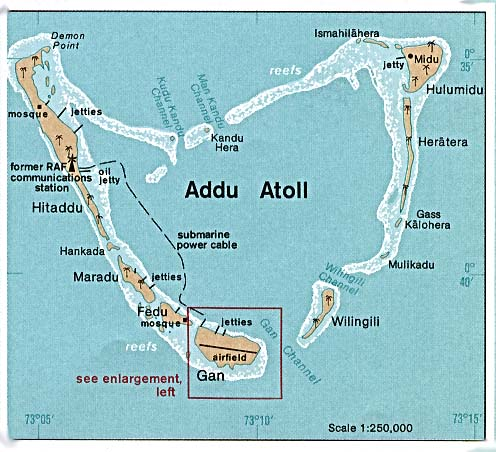
Addu Atoll map in 1976.

In August 1941, the netlayer HMS Guardian landed Royal Navy construction crews on Addu Atoll in the Maldives Islands to begin work on a secret naval base for Britain's Eastern Fleet. Though in public British leaders continued to point to Singapore as the lynchpin of the Far Eastern defences, they had already grown concerned that the "Malay Barrier" of Malaya, Sumatra and Java could not be held in the event of a Japanese attack.

The British Eastern Fleet had left most of its base facilities in Singapore, including drydocks and repair sheds. In the event of Singapore's loss, it was to fall back on Trincomalee on Ceylon's eastern coast. But Admiral James Somerville, the fleet commander, found the port inadequate and doubted that it could be defended from determined attack. He wanted an alternative base somewhere in the middle of the Indian Ocean, which became known as "Port T." Not openly stated, but understood, was that such a secret island base would also be secure from the prying eyes of Indian nationalists, all of whom were suspected of being in league with the Japanese during the paranoid days of late 1941.

Addu Atoll, also known as Seenu, is the southernmost island group in the Maldives. It consists of several large islands ringing a deep lagoon. There are several channels leading into the lagoon, with the best of these at the southern end of the atoll. The Royal Navy selected the southernmost island, Gan (pronounced "Yahn"), for their airfield and began construction of three crushed-coral airstrips for the Fleet Air Arm. This was turned over to the Royal Air Force in 1957 and became "RAF Station Gan," an airfield that would be used intermittently until 1971. The FAA airfield on Gan in theory could handle all aircraft in the British inventory, but it had short runways and larger bombers often crashed on landing.

While troops hacked down the jungle on Gan and prepared the airstrips, Catalina and Sunderland flying boats began operating from the jetties on the north shore of Gan. The airfield's most important facilities were the big oil tanks built on Gan and on Hitaddu Island on the western edge of the atoll. These would by necessity be visible from far out at sea, but the islands’ low elevation made this inevitable, no matter where they were placed.

The 1st Royal Marine Coast Defence Regiment provided the garrison troops, manning shore batteries and anti-aircraft guns on all six of the atoll's major islands. To facilitate the defence, the important islands on the western edge of the atoll would eventually be linked by a light railway across causeways built up between the islands, but this was not operational until much later in the war. Except for the Gan Channel, the other openings were permanently closed by anti-submarine nets.

A pair of Australian refrigerator ships were requisitioned in Sydney, loaded with canned foods, several tons of American-made cigarettes and 5,200 gallons of rum, and stationed in the lagoon to re-supply British warships. These had Chinese crews and Australian civilian officers, and most of the work was handled by Maldivians hired from the local population.

Addu Atoll has since become a major tourist destination, but British personnel assigned there in 1942 despised the post. Morale appears to have been very low among the garrison, and ships’ crews considered it a hardship post. Forty miles south of the equator, the islands are very hot and extremely humid. Gan had no recreational facilities and the local women were strictly off-limits.

The Japanese were not aware of the base's existence during the April 1942 carrier raids in the Indian Ocean, and Somerville's fleet used it extensively. Later in the war, submarine reconnaissance established the base's existence, but by this point the Imperial Navy had no designs for a large-scale offensive in the Indian Ocean. The German submarine U-183 did torpedo the tanker British Loyalty in March 1944, making a long-range shot from outside the atoll through a gap in the anti-torpedo nets.

=== British naval base ===
The Royal Navy established a base ("Port T") – later RAF Gan from 1957 – on the island of Gan (Addu City) (pronounced "Gun") in 1941, during World War II. During the Cold War, it was used as an outpost.

The original naval base was established as a fallback for the British Eastern Fleet. Despite public pronouncements to the contrary, the official view was that the main base at Singapore would be untenable if the Japanese made serious headway in Malaya and Java – which, in the event, is what happened in 1942. The intention had been to operate from trincomalee in Sri Lanka . Upon inspection, however, the naval commander-in-chief, Admiral James Somerville, found the port inadequate, vulnerable to a determined attack and open to spying. An isolated island base with a safe, deep anchorage in a suitably strategic position was required, and Addu City met the requirements. Once available, its facilities were used extensively by the Fleet.

Royal Navy engineers landed in August 1941 from HMS Guardian to clear and construct airstrips on Gan for the Fleet Air Arm. In the interim, Catalina and Sunderland flying boats operated from jetties on the northern, sheltered side of Gan. Large oil tanks were built on Gan, and on Hitaddu Island on the western edge of the atoll; vital elements for a naval base. These were visible from a long distance at sea, but this was unavoidable, given the atoll's low profile.

Ships' supplies for the fleet were provided from a pair of Australian refrigerated ships, Changte and Taiping, that included Attu in a number of bases that they serviced regularly. Three times these ships replenished forty or more ships of the Eastern Fleet. Several large Second Australian Imperial Force troop convoys also refuelled at Addu on their way from Aden to Fremantle, Western Australia.

The six major islands were garrisoned by the 1st Royal Marine Coast Defense Regiment, manning shore batteries and anti-aircraft guns. To facilitate the defence, causeways were built connecting the western islands of Gan, Aboohéra, Maradhoo and Hithadhoo. And, much later in the war, they were linked by a light railway. Addu was an unpopular posting due to the hot, humid climate, lack of recreational facilities and lack of socialising with the local population.

The Japanese remained unaware of the base's existence until their plans for expansion in south-east Asia had come to nothing, even during their carrier raids in the Indian Ocean in April 1942. Later in the war, submarine reconnaissance established the base's existence. Despite openings into the lagoon being permanently closed by anti-submarine nets, the German submarine U-183 torpedoed the tanker British Loyalty in March 1944 (she had been previously torpedoed and sunk at Diego Suarez); it was an impressive long-range shot from outside the atoll through a gap in the anti-torpedo nets. Although seriously damaged, the tanker did not sink. She was not fully repaired but kept as a Ministry of War Transport Oil Fuel Storage Vessel. There was significant oil pollution after this incident, and British personnel were used to clean the lagoon.

On 5 January 1946, British Loyalty was scuttled in a lagoon southeast of Hithadhoo Island in Addu City. After some years of leaking oil, she has become a popular dive location and a haven for the local marine life.

In 1957, the naval base was transferred to the Royal Air Force. As RAF Station Gan, it remained in intermittent service until 1975, when British Forces withdrew.

Most of the employees who had experience working for the British military had good English fluency. When RAF Station Gan closed, they turned to the nascent tourism industry for employment. As a result, there was an influx of Addu people to Malé seeking employment in the nearby resorts and also looking for education for their children. Ex RAF Gan is now a tourist resort, an equator village, with the airstrip now being Gan International Airport.

=== The United Suvadive Republic ===
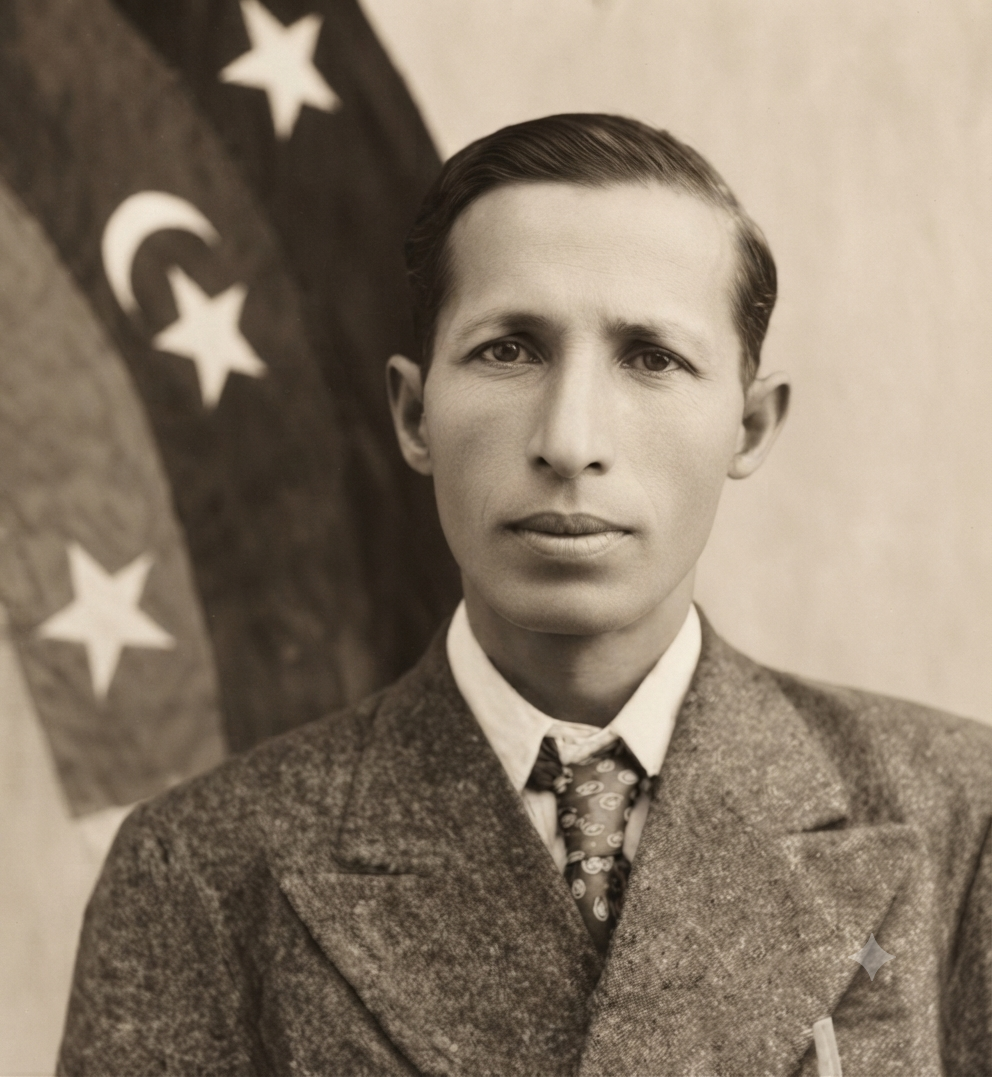
Abdullah Afif, leader of the secessionist United Suvadive Republic (1959–1963)

The United Suvadive Republic (Dhivehi: އެކުވެރި ސުވާދީބު ޖުމްހޫރިއްޔާ) or Suvadive Islands was a short-lived breakaway nation in the remote Southern Atolls of the Maldive Islands, namely Addu Atoll, Huvadhu Atoll and Fuvahmulah that geographically make up the Suvadive archipelago.

The name of this nation was originally an ancient name for the three southernmost atolls of the Maldives. Suvadive (ސުވާދީބު) is based on the ancient name for Huvadhu Atoll, which is by far the largest in the small southern atoll group; in fact, Huvadhu/Suvadive atoll is the second largest atoll formation. Huvadhu Atoll was also called Suadou by Pyrard. Huvadhu Atoll was marked as 'Suvadina' in Dutch colonial-era maps.

The Suvadive secession occurred in the context of the struggle of the Maldives emerging as a modern nation. The alleged causes were the centralist policies of the government in Malé and the recent independence of both neighbouring countries, India and Ceylon. At that time, the Maldives had remained a British protectorate. The Suvadives declared independence on 3 January 1959. They capitulated, rejoining the rest of the nation on 23 September 1963.

=== Addu City ===
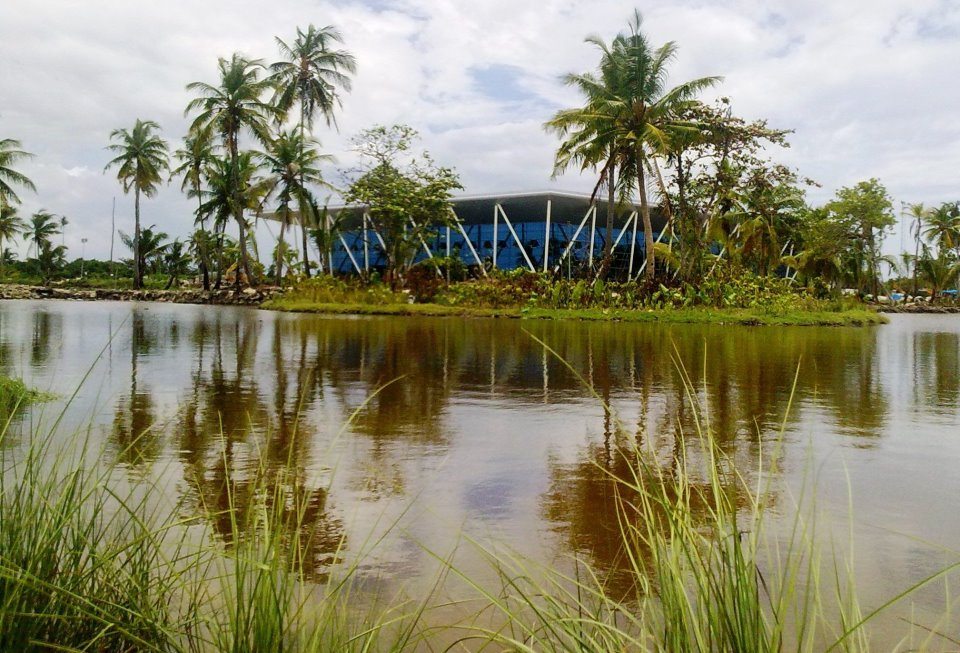
Addu's Equatorial Convention Centre, 2011

Speaking to the press at the President's Office, Nasheed said that after official discussions with the main opposition Dhivehi Rayyithunge Party (DRP), the parties agreed to jointly propose amendments to the Decentralisation Act, based on the results of the referendum, and list administrative constituencies by October 2017.

“When the islands are announced, there will be a major change to the largest atoll in the south, Addu Atoll" he said, "In my view, the results of the referendum showed very clearly that citizens of the atoll want to develop as a city. So we will designate Addu Atoll as one city island. Addu Atoll is an island with the districts Hithadhoo, Maradhoo-Feydhoo, Maradhoo, Hulhudhoo and Meedhoo.”

Instead of an atoll office, he continued, the southernmost atoll will have a municipality run by an elected municipal council.

With over 30,000 inhabitants, Addu Atoll is the second largest population centre in the country. However, as much as 60 per cent of some islands currently reside in the capital Male’.

President Nasheed denied that the results and the low turnout were a failure of the government, as small islands rejected the government proposal for administrative consolidation with larger islands.

“In a democracy, if an election is seen as useless, there's nothing I have to say about that," he said.

Moreover, Nasheed argued that establishing a nationwide transport network was the government's policy on population consolidation, as outlined in the ruling Maldivian Democratic Party's (MDP) manifesto, as opposed to "taking a population and settling them in another island.”

While the referendum revealed that small islands did not want to "lose their identity", Nasheed said that a secret ballot was needed to determine the views of the electorate as he routinely received petitions from islanders requesting relocation.

According to official results, of 26,676 people who participated in the referendum, 16,695 voted in favour of the proposal while 8,402 voted against it.

However, of the six islands in Addu Atoll where voting took place, citizens of Hithadhoo, Maradhoo, Maradhoo-Feydhoo, Feydhoo, Meedhoo and Hulhudhoo endorsed the proposal, while islanders of Feydhoo and Meedhoo rejected it.

The first and only mayor of the city is Abdulla Sodiq, who was elected in February 2011 to a three-year term and re-elected in February 2014 to another three-year term.

== Districts ==
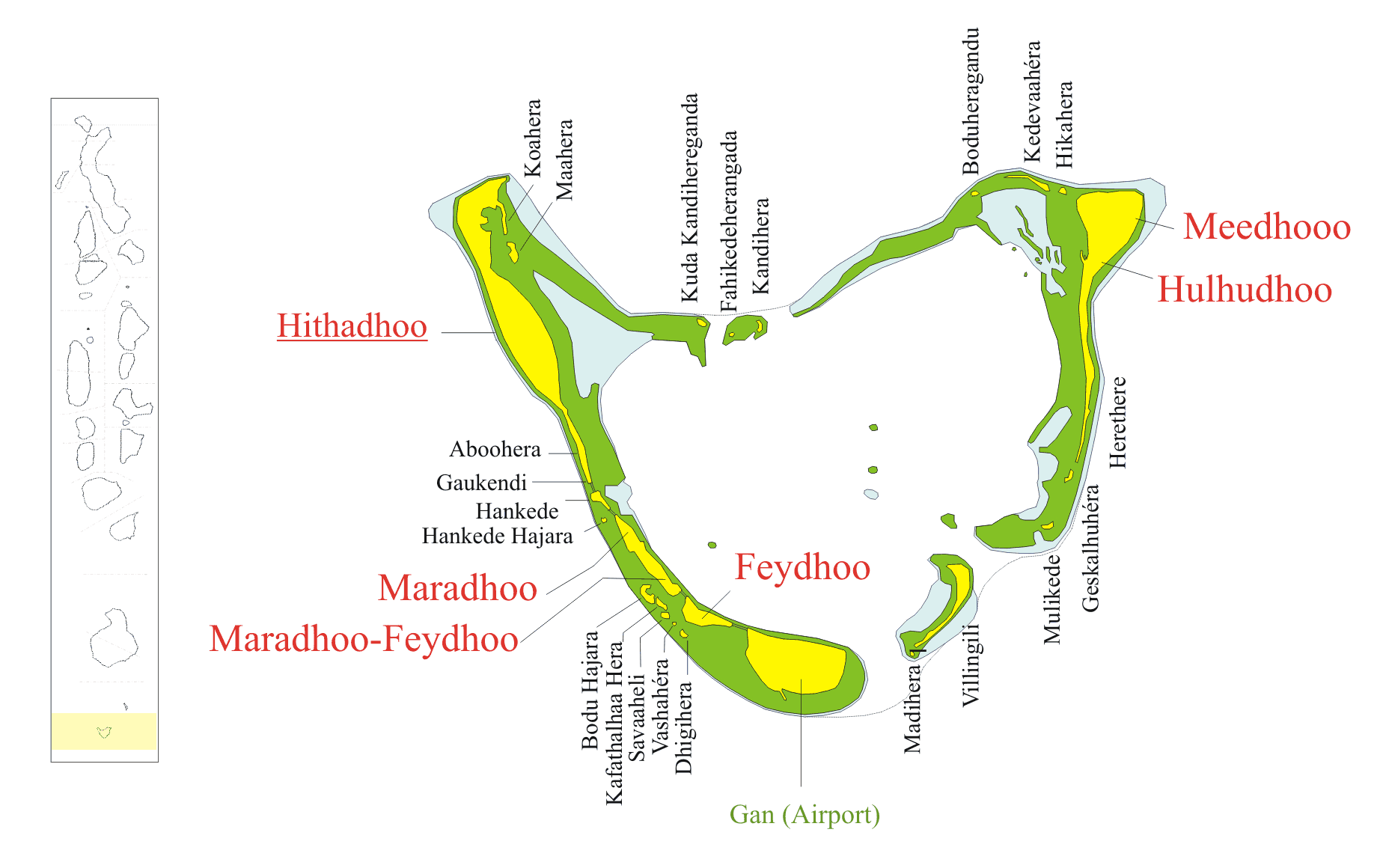

There are 5 districts of Addu City; they are:

- Gan
- Feydhoo
- Maradhoo-Feydhoo
- Maradhoo
- Hithadhoo

Hithadhoo is the main administrative district of Addu City, with many of the administrative buildings in this district. The town is situated on the island of the same name, the westernmost of Seenu (Addu). In terms of population count, Hithadhoo is home to the largest population in Addu City.

== Healthcare ==
The government-owned Addu Equatorial Hospital is the only tertiary hospital in the southern region and is mandated to function and provide around-the-clock care. Health Centers are also established in the Islands to provide basic and emergency services. Private clinics such as AIMS Diagnostic Care, Eye Care Clinic and IMDC (International Medical and Diagnostic Center) have also opened their branches in Addu.

All citizens are covered through the Government's Universal health coverage system Aasandha.

== Linguistics ==
The dialect spoken in this atoll (Addu bahuruva) is quite different from the official form of the Dhivehi language. It has some affinities with the dialect of Fuvahmulah (Mulaku dialect).

Traditionally, all educated islanders from the three different atolls of the south adopted the Addu dialect as lingua franca. Hence, when, for example, an islander of Huvadhu met with another from Fuvahmulah, they would use the Addu dialect to talk to each other. Addu dialect is the most widespread and famous dialect in the southern region of the Maldives.

The secessionist government of the United Suvadive Republic (Suvadives), however, used the Malé dialect in its official correspondence.

== Culture and significance ==
Addu has some of the earliest settlements in the Maldives. The culture and linguistics compared to all other parts of Maldives are different.

It was distinguished by strong social divisions and a strong hierarchical system. Traditionally, the upper classes—with names like Don Seedi, Don Kaloa, Fulhu, Manik, and Didi—were close friends and relatives of the sultan and his royal family. Yet, even among these families, there were marked differences. Well into the 20th century, HCP Bell noted that "a Didi marrying a Maniku lady raises her to his own rank; but the children of a Maniku father and Didi mother are, strictly speaking, not entitled to the appellation Didi".

Years ago, it was unacceptable to eat with a member of an inferior class, and people of a lower class mixing with a superior only sat on a low stool. Now these distinctions are not acceptable in society.

The number of islands a person leases, or the number of boats they own, was also crucial to their social standing during the sultanate era. The boat owner took about half the day's catch, while the skipper (keyolhu) earned about one-fifth. The rest was divided equally among the fishermen. The men who make the boats (Maavadi meehaa) were respected craftsmen; the fishermen's lives, and thus the well-being of the community, depended upon their skill. The medicine men (Hakeem) stood on the same social rung. Skilled tradesmen, like blacksmiths and jewellers, also commanded a great deal of respect. At the bottom of the social heap was the toddy-tapper (Raaveria) who looked after the coconuts and tapped sap for toddy and syrup.

The sharp division of labour not only reflects the exigencies of island life, but the injunctions of traditional Islam.

The rapid economic growth and educational development of the Maldives has completely wiped out the traditional class system.

=== Sports ===
==== Football ====
Football is deeply embedded in the culture of Addu City, with legacy stretching back to the 1960s. Football in Addu began gaining momentum during the 1960s, particularly with the emergence of the legendary DNC Football Team. Known for their dominance and flair, the team became a symbol of pride for the southern Maldives. Among its most iconic figures were Muhammad Labeeb and Abdulla Mufeed (“Uduhey Mufeed”). The city has produced some of the nation's most talented footballers and futsal players, many of whom have represented Maldives at national and international levels.

1st Division and National Team Players

Over the decades, Addu City has continued to produce footballers who have reached the pinnacle of Maldivian football in the Dhivehi League / Premier League and the national team.

Notable footballers include:

- Shamweel Qasim (“Bonda”) – A creative midfielder from Hithadhoo who played for Addu City FC and the Maldives national football team. Widely regarded as one of the best footballers in Addu's history.
- Mohamed Arif (“Baka”) – A technically gifted player known for his time with multiple top-division clubs.
- Ibrahim Mahudhee (“Ibbe”) – A modern-day striker who has become a key player for the national team and one of Addu City's most prominent football exports.
- Ali Nafiu ("Kalhey") - known for his intelligent playmaking, creative vision, and calm presence in midfield
- Ahmed Saeed "Ammaty" - known for his commanding presence as a left-back
- Abdulla Haneef - one of the most experienced defenders in Maldivian domestic football, with a career spanning nearly two decades.

==== Futsal ====
Addu City is also a hub for futsal talent, producing players who've dominated national tournaments such as the Golden Futsal Challenge and Club Maldives Cup.

Notable futsal players include:

- Hazim Fauzy ("Hathi") – Known for his attacking instinct and dominance in central play.
- Hussain Ghassan Labeeb ("Hussy") – A technically brilliant futsal player, recognized for his creativity and goal-scoring ability. He is the son of Mohamed Labeeb, one of the most renowned players from the legendary DNC Football Team of the 1960s.

== White tern ==
The White tern (Gygis alba), locally known as Dhondheeni(ދޮންދީނި), sometimes called Kandhuvalu dhooni, is a small seabird traditionally only confined to the Addu Atoll, the southernmost atoll in the Maldives. The white tern has its body white with black eye-ring and black bill with a blue base. Legs and feet are also blue, with yellow on the webs. In recent decades, the white tern has been proudly used as a symbol by the people of Addu Atoll to represent their atoll in the Maldives.

=== Feeding habits ===
The White tern primarily feeds on smaller fish which it catches by plunge diving down on the surface, but it does not submerge fully. It is a long-lived bird, having been recorded living for 18 years.

=== Breeding ===
This small sea bird is well known for laying a single speckled egg on exposed thin branches in a small joint or depression without a nest. The thin branches it chooses are an act of predator-avoidance behaviour; crows (Corvus splendens maledivicus) and even rats avoid sitting or climbing small branches. However, terns are vulnerable to strong winds, and the chicks have sophisticated, sharp clawed feet to cling to fragile branches.

== Addu Kandu ==
Addu Kandu is the local name for the broad channel between Huvadu Atoll and Addu Atoll. The old French maps called it 'Courant d'Addoue'.

== Tourism ==
Tourist development in Addu has been slow to start, but a resort has been established in the old RAF buildings on Gan, and there are now reliable connections to the capital via Maldivian, Mega Maldives and Flyme. The Ocean Reef Resort is not a typical Maldives tropical paradise resort island, but the old military base is a unique feature. Gan is linked by causeways to the adjacent islands, and it's easy and pleasant to get around them by bicycle, giving unmatched opportunities to visit the local villages and see village life. There are two island resorts in Addu City. Shangri-La Villingili Maldives Resort and Canareef Addu.

Hankede Island has been proposed as a location for a new resort. However, for years this plan has been halted by the government even after interest from several foreign developers.

Gan International Airport has been open since 2013 for international flights. SriLankan Airlines became the first international airline to fly to the Gan International Airport, facilitating a direct connection between Colombo and Ganat.

== Events ==
=== 17th SAARC Summit 2011 ===
The 17th SAARC summit was hosted by Addu City and neighbouring Fuvahmulah in November 2011. The preparations for the summit brought numerous developments to the city, including the building of a convention centre, development of roads and public places, renovation of Gan International Airport and the regional hospital, and more job opportunities among many others.

==== Equatorial Convention Centre ====
Equatorial Convention Centre (ECC) is a convention centre which is located in Hithadhoo, Addu City of Maldives. It was specially built for the seventeenth SAARC summit, which was held in November 2011 in Addu City and nearby Fuvahmulah island. ECC was formally opened by the President of the Maldives, H.E Mohamed Nasheed, on 10 November 2011. Equatorial Convention Centre has now been converted to a tertiary hospital and was later renamed as Addu Equatorial Hospital.

==== Halls and rooms ====
The names of the halls and rooms in the convention centre have been named after historical and cultural places and aspects of Addu and the atolls of the Maldives, with the main convention hall called 'Bodu Kiba'.

The public lobby has been named ‘Addu Thalhanmathi’ with ‘Velaanaa Fendaa’, ‘Eggamu Fendaa’, ‘Kakaa Fendaa’ and ‘Athiree Fendaa’ declared as names for the rooms of the convention centre. ‘Rasruku Kibaa’ is the name of the main banquet hall.

The two-storey convention centre, which has been built for the SAARC Summit with an Rf150 million budget, has an administrative office named ‘Mulee Kotari’, a Business Centre called ‘Badikoshee Kotari’ and a Meeting Room named ‘Dhandikoshee’.

The delegation offices have been named after the atolls of the Maldives: ‘Thiladhunmathi Kotari’, Faadhippolhu Kotari’, ‘Ihavandhippolhu Kotari’, ‘Hadhunmathi Kotari’, ‘Huvadhoo Kotari’, ‘Kolhumadulu Kotari’, ‘Nilandhe Kotari’ and ‘Maalhosmadulu Kotari’.

Rooms located on the first floor include the ‘Dhondhanbu Kibaa’ and ‘Jaafaanu Kibaa’ Function Rooms. The Seminar Rooms located on the first floor have been named as ‘Mas’udi Kotari’, ‘Pyrad Kotari’, ‘Abu’l Barakat Kotari’, ‘Batuta Kotari’, ‘Kalhuoh Fummi Kotari’, ‘Thirnaa Kotari ', ‘Jaliyaa Kotari’ and ‘Kalhihaara Kotari’.

== Transportation ==
=== Addu Linkroad ===
The 16-kilometre (9.9 mi) Addu Link Road causeway is the second longest paved causeway in the Maldives. It joins Hithadhoo, Maradhoo, Maradhoo-feydhoo, Feydhoo, and Gan.

The Addu Link Road was the site of the second longest banner ever to be displayed in the Maldives.

Since its construction, several fatal accidents have occurred on the Addu Link Road, which local news sources have ascribed to high speeds and reckless driving. Addu City is connected via ferry from Hulhumeedhoo ward to Feydhoo.

=== Gan Airport ===
Gan International Airport is the airport serving Addu City, located on the island of Gan nearby. First built by the British Royal Navy and transferred to the Royal Air Force as RAF Gan, Gan International Airport was originally a military airbase built during World War II and remained in use until the 1970s. The United Kingdom transferred ownership to the government of the Maldives, and it was converted for use as a domestic airport. Recently, the airport was upgraded to international standards in preparation for international flights expected with the opening of tourist resorts in the area. The airport was privatised under a 30-year contract signed in June 2010. A new VVIP lounge also has been built for the SAARC summit.

== Climate ==
Climate data for Addu City (S. Gan station, 2000–2024 averages)
Month	Jan	Feb	Mar	Apr	May	Jun	Jul	Aug	Sep	Oct	Nov	Dec	Year
Mean daily maximum °C (°F)	30.91 (87.64)	31.31 (88.36)	31.72 (89.10)	31.76 (89.17)	31.46 (88.63)	31.33 (88.39)	31.00 (87.80)	30.91 (87.64)	30.79 (87.42)	30.81 (87.46)	30.73 (87.31)	30.77 (87.39)	31.13 (88.03)
Daily mean °C (°F)	28.10 (82.58)	28.48 (83.26)	28.66 (83.59)	28.67 (83.61)	28.53 (83.35)	28.36 (83.05)	28.00 (82.40)	27.93 (82.27)	27.86 (82.15)	27.84 (82.11)	27.80 (82.04)	27.88 (82.18)	28.18 (82.72)
Mean daily minimum °C (°F)	25.36 (77.65)	25.71 (78.28)	25.63 (78.13)	25.65 (78.17)	25.65 (78.17)	25.45 (77.81)	25.06 (77.11)	25.01 (77.02)	24.98 (76.96)	24.91 (76.84)	24.95 (76.91)	25.06 (77.11)	25.29 (77.52)
Average rainfall mm (inches)	173 (6.8)	82 (3.2)	112 (4.4)	169 (6.7)	258 (10.2)	136 (5.4)	206 (8.1)	191 (7.5)	206 (8.1)	240 (9.4)	242 (9.5)	215 (8.5)	2,231 (87.8)
Mean monthly sunshine hours	242	245	271	244	226	200	206	210	209	219	221	229	2,722
Source 1: Maldives Bureau of Statistics
Source 2: NOAA (relative humidity and sun 1961–1990)

== Notable residents ==
- Safaath Ahmed Zahir, human rights activist
- Hassan Ugail , mathematician and computer scientist
- Katheeb Moosa Raha, Last Atoll Chief of Gan, Addu
- Abdull Afif Didi, Political Figure
- Hussain Salahuddin, One of the greatest Dhivehi writers, poets, educators and Islamic scholars
- Dr Hassan Saeed, Lawyer, legal scholar and former Attorney General
- Abdulla Sodiq, The first elected mayor of Addu City
- Ali Nizar, Prominent advocate for Addu’s development, infrastructure and decentralisation
- Shamweel Qasim, One of the most accomplished footballers produced by Addu
- Mohamed Arif, One of the most respected Maldivian midfielders of his generation
- Ibrahim Mahudhee, Modern-day national team striker and prominent football export from Addu
- Mohamed Naeem, Businessman and Entrepreneur
- Hussain Rasheed, Assistant Commissioner of Police
- Ali Ihusaan, Minister of Homeland Security, Labour and Technology
- Ahmed Saeed "Ammaty", known for his commanding presence as a left-back
- Ali Nafiu, highly regarded in Addu's football history as a technically gifted, intelligent playmaker
- Abdulla Haneef, one of the most experienced defenders in Maldivian domestic football, with a career spanning nearly two decades.
- Muhammad Labeeb - Renowned for his intelligence on the field and leadership
- Abdulla Mufeed, Nicknamed “Flying Mufeed” for his remarkable speed and agility
- Al Ghazi Mohamed Shamsudheen, Chief justice of the Maldives
- Ibrahim Mohamed Didi, Brigadier General (Retired) and Politician
- Sheikh Hussain Sharafuddeen Al-Azhari - esteemed Islamic scholar
- Ahmed Solih Ali Didi - Atoll Chief of Addu Atoll Dedicated 45 years to public service
