= 1959 Maldivian revolt referendum =

A referendum on taking military action to conquer the breakaway United Suvadive Republic was held in the Maldives in March 1959. The proposal was approved by voters. The official results were lost.

== Aftermath ==
In July 1959 Maldivian troops recaptured the atolls of Huvadu and Fuvahmulah, but there were still more uprisings on these islands in the following years. In February 1960, the United Kingdom was able to retake the island of Gan, but allowed the Suvadive Republic to last on Addu Atoll until 22 September 1963, when the British withdrew support for the rebels and handed the island back to the Malé government. The former British military base was later converted into Gan International Airport.
