= Hithadhoo (Addu) =

Hithadhoo ހިތަދޫ
- District of Addu City
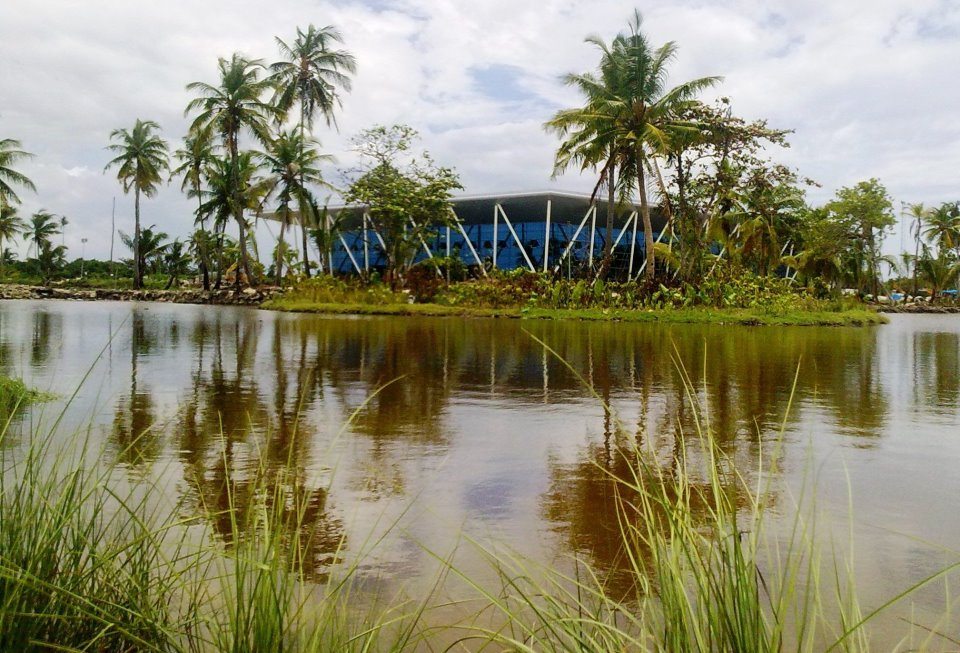
- Equatorial Convention Centre, located in Hithadhoo

- Location in Maldives Hithadhoo (Asia)
- Coordinates: 0.609429°S 73.089931°E
- Country: Maldives
- Geographic atoll: Addu Atoll
- Distance to Malé: 531 km (330 mi)

Area
  - Total: 5.4 km^{2} (2.1 sq mi)

Population (2024)
  - Total: 16,865
  - Density: 3,100/km^{2} (8,100/sq mi)
- Time zone: UTC+05:00 (MST)

Hithadhoo (Dhivehi: ހިތަދޫ) is a district of Addu City, in the Maldives. Hithadhoo is the main administrative district of Addu City, with many of the administrative buildings in this district. The town is situated on the island of the same name, the westernmost of Addu Atoll (previously known as Seenu Atoll). In terms of population, Hithadhoo is home to the largest population in Addu City. According to the 2022 Census, with 13,759 residents, Hithadhoo also has the largest population of any administrative island in Maldives, a category that excludes the much larger national capital, Malé.

== Geography ==
The island is 531.12 km (330 mi; 287 nmi) south of the country's capital, Malé. Hithadhoo is the second largest island in the Maldives, with a surface area of 540 ha (5.4 km^{2}; 2.1 mi^{2}). It has a length of 6.8 km (4.2 mi) and a width of 1.8 km (1.1 mi) at its widest point.

The part of the island south of the town is lushly vegetated with palms and shrubs, whilst the northern end of the island consists of a partially stony, unreal scrubland, which can be explored only on narrow trails. Hithadhoo Town is marked by dusty roads, narrow lanes, leaning houses and dense vegetation. Island traffic is generally quite colourful, particularly when hundreds of island school children dressed in a multitude of differently coloured school uniforms queue up for buses.

=== Climate ===
Hithadhoo has a tropical monsoon climate (Köppen: Am).

Climate data for Hithadhoo
Month	Jan	Feb	Mar	Apr	May	Jun	Jul	Aug	Sep	Oct	Nov	Dec	Year
Mean daily maximum °C (°F)	27.7 (81.9)	28.0 (82.4)	28.5 (83.3)	28.7 (83.7)	28.6 (83.5)	28.4 (83.1)	28.1 (82.6)	27.9 (82.2)	27.9 (82.2)	27.8 (82.0)	27.7 (81.9)	27.6 (81.7)	28.1 (82.5)
Daily mean °C (°F)	27.1 (80.8)	27.4 (81.3)	27.8 (82.0)	27.9 (82.2)	27.9 (82.2)	27.8 (82.0)	27.3 (81.1)	27.3 (81.1)	27.2 (81.0)	27.1 (80.8)	26.9 (80.4)	26.9 (80.4)	27.4 (81.3)
Mean daily minimum °C (°F)	26.3 (79.3)	26.7 (80.1)	27.0 (80.6)	27.0 (80.6)	27.0 (80.6)	26.9 (80.4)	26.4 (79.5)	26.3 (79.3)	26.4 (79.5)	26.2 (79.2)	26.1 (79.0)	26.1 (79.0)	26.5 (79.8)
Average precipitation mm (inches)	148.6 (5.85)	81.4 (3.20)	96.5 (3.80)	161.5 (6.36)	208.1 (8.19)	103.9 (4.09)	148.8 (5.86)	129.0 (5.08)	150.3 (5.92)	205.5 (8.09)	225.3 (8.87)	209.5 (8.25)	1,868.4 (73.56)
Source: Weather.Directory

== Population ==
According to the 2022 census, Hithadhoo has a population of 13,759 residents, and is the second largest settlement in the Maldives. The Addu dialect of Dhivehi language is spoken by most of the people who live here. The Addu dialect is closely related to dialects spoken on nearby atolls. It is also the second most spoken dialect in the whole Maldives after Malé dialect.

Historical population
Year	Pop.	±%
2014	10,398	—
2022	13,759	+32.3%
2024	16,865	+22.6%
2014-2022-2024: Census populations Source:

== Economy ==
Youth (15–20) unemployment rate is at a high 46% (37% Male: 54% Female); the proportion of population having telephone connections is 96%.

== Services ==
=== Education ===
Hithadhoo has a number of educational institutions; 3 kindergartens (nursery schools), three primary and three secondary schools as well as a college. Most Hithadhoo residents complete their education up to Ordinary Level on the island itself, whilst a few options to continue their studies in Malé or abroad. A certain number of youngsters from neighbouring islands, mainly from Maradhoo, Maradhoo-Feydhoo, and Feydhoo attend sharafuddin School, a secondary school on Hithadhoo, to complete their O-level studies. Several students from other atolls like Fuvahmulah attend secondary schools on Hithadhoo in order to have a better education than can be had on their home islands.

=== Healthcare ===
The government has provided the residents with a hospital. This hospital has a regional function and provides around-the-clock care. Most residents of neighbouring islands visit Hithadhoo Regional Hospital to receive treatment for their ailments. People from atolls and islands further afield, such as Fuvammulah and Huvadhu Atoll also occasionally visit to receive medical treatment, although most opt for hospitals in the Southern Indian state of Kerala which provides a much wider range of facilities than available in Maldives. Apart from this, there are some private clinics like Eye Care Clinic. Eye Care is a reputed private organization in Maldives for its quality service with qualified Ophthalmologists and Optometrists and branded items. It is the largest eye-care provider in Maldives with its six outlets in different parts of the country including the one in S. Hithadhoo.

== See also ==
- Abdullah Afeef
