= Addu =

Addu may refer to:

- Addu Atoll, a geographic atoll
- Addu City, an administrative city consisting of the inhabited islands of Addu Atoll
- Ateneo de Davao University, a catholic university in Davao City
