= Safaath Ahmed Zahir =

Maldivian human rights activist

- ސަފާތު އަހައްމަދު ޒާހިރު
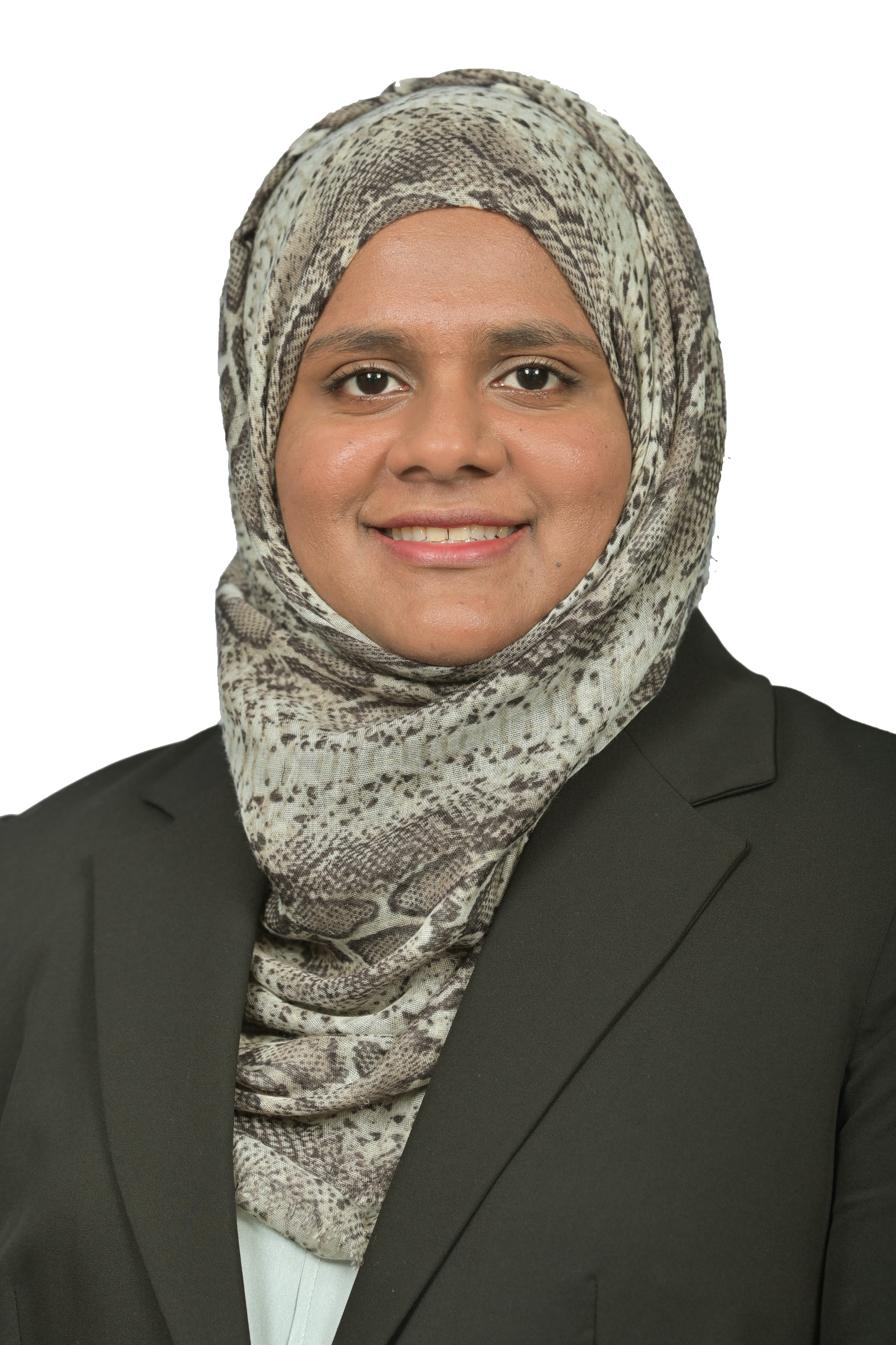
- Zahir in 2022
- Born: Addu City, Maldives
- Education: Monash University; University of Nottingham
- Known for: Women's rights activist
- Political party: Maldivian Democratic Party (2016–present)

Safaath Ahmed Zahir (Dhivehi: ސަފާތު އަހައްމަދު ޒާހިރު) is a Maldivian women’s rights advocate, globally recognized for her work on women’s empowerment and civic leadership. With over 11 years of experience, she is the Co-Founder and Executive President of Women & Democracy (W&D), a leading women’s rights NGO in the Maldives.

W&D has directly benefited over 12,000 women through programs in political participation, domestic violence support, civic education, and economic empowerment. The organization operates through coordinators in all 20 geographic atolls and is widely respected as a leading grassroots movement.

Zahir is one of the most internationally decorated civil society leaders from the Maldives, with honors including the Queen’s Young Leader Award, UN Young Leader, Forbes 30 Under 30 Asia (in 2017), and AACSB Influential Leader Award.

== Biography ==
Ahmed was born and raised in Addu City, Maldives. She has a degree in banking and finance from Monash University's Malaysian campus in Subang Jaya, as well as a master's degree in finance and investment from the University of Nottingham in the United Kingdom. She worked for a time as a financial consultant.

Ahmed returned to the Maldives to co-found and lead Women on Boards, a non-governmental organisation that promoted gender diversity in the workplace through the provision of development workshops, scholarship programmes, and advocacy campaigns in order to have more women on corporate boards in the Maldives. Through Women on Boards, Ahmed co-authored the Gender Equality Manifesto, which the organisation lobbied politicians and other leaders to formally pledge to implement.

In 2016, Ahmed established Women and Democracy, a non-governmental organisation that expanded on the scope of Women on Boards by aiming to increase female representation in policy and decision making, including within the political sphere. It also supported female victims of domestic abuse by establishing a helpline and providing counselling services. Through Women and Democracy, Ahmed completed political empowerment workshops on all 20 Maldivian atolls.

In 2016, Ahmed received the Young Leaders Award from the Queen's Commonwealth Trust for "taking the lead in transforming the lives of others and making a lasting difference in her community". She was given the award by Elizabeth II at a ceremony in Buckingham Palace on 23 June 2016. That year, Ahmed was also selected by the United Nations as among 17 youth activists named as leaders in achieving its Sustainable Development Goals, in recognition of her work empowering women in the Maldives.

In 2017, Forbes named Ahmed as among its 30 Under 30 Social Entrepreneurs in Asia. That same year, she attended the International Youth Forum in China, representing the Maldives.

Zahir is an ardent supporter of the Maldivian Democratic Party (MDP) and is active in its political activities, frequently attending party rallies. In 2019, Ahmed announced her candidacy to serve as president of the Maldivian Democratic Party's women's wing; she ultimately placed second to Rozaina Adam.

On 22 August, the President of the Maldives, Ibrahim Mohamed Solih, announced that Ahmed would be joining the Ministry of Foreign Affairs as a communication strategist, having previously worked as an assistant director in the President's Office.

During the COVID-19 pandemic in the Maldives from 2020, Ahmed led a campaign to provide menstrual products to female emergency workers and volunteers, as well as to quarantined and isolated women during lockdowns.

In 2023, she served as the Commonwealth Foundation's Civil Society Advisory Governors from 2023 to 2025.

In 2024, she contested in that year's parliamentary election from the capital Malé, placing second in a competitive race, and was noted for breaking ground in the country’s male-dominated political landscape.

In 2025, the Asia Society named Ahmed as one of that year's Next Generation Fellows, marking the first time a Maldivian had been selected.

Zahir presently served as a board member of the Give to Africa charity.
