= Ahmed Saeed (footballer, born 1980) =

Maldivian footballer

Personal information
- Full name: Ahmed Saeed
- Date of birth: 14 May 1980 (age 46)
- Place of birth: Feydhoo, Seenu Atoll, Maldives
- Height: 1.70 m (5 ft 7 in)
- Position: Midfielder

Team information
- Current team: Victory SC
- Number: 14

Youth career
- Feydhoo: Victory SC

Senior career*
Years	Team	Apps	(Gls)
1997–1999	New Radiant		
2000–2004	Victory SC		
2005–2006	New Radiant		
2007–2009	Victory SC		
2010–2011	VB Sports Club		
2012	Victory SC		
2012	VB Addu FC		

International career
???? –	Maldives	?	(?)
- * Club domestic league appearances and goals

Ahmed "Ammaty" Saeed (born 14 May 1980) nicknamed “Ammaty”, is a retired Maldivian footballer known for his commanding presence as a left-back. Born in Feydhoo, Addu City, he built a solid club career with New Radiant SC, Victory SC, and VB Sports Club, before finishing his later years with VB Addu FC. Internationally, he featured for Maldives and was part of the historic 2008 SAFF Championship-winning team, playing a notable role in the defensive line.

He was first selected for the under 19 team from Zone 8 (Addu & Fuvahmulah) for a football match to be played with nder 19 national team to mark the youth day in 1997. He displayed an outstanding performance and was well noticed. He was immediately selected to the Under 19 national side and New Radiant signed him in the same year. He is known as the best left back born in the country so far.

He was among the key players who helped Maldives to win the first SAFF championship 2008 at Colombo / Male. He was employed with the Maldives Airports Company Ltd.

Saeed retired from professional football during the 2012 season.

== Honours ==
Maldives

- SAFF Championship: 2008
