= Maradhoo-Feydhoo =

Maradhoo-Feydhoo މަރަދޫފޭދޫ
- District of Addu City
- Maradhoo-Feydhoo
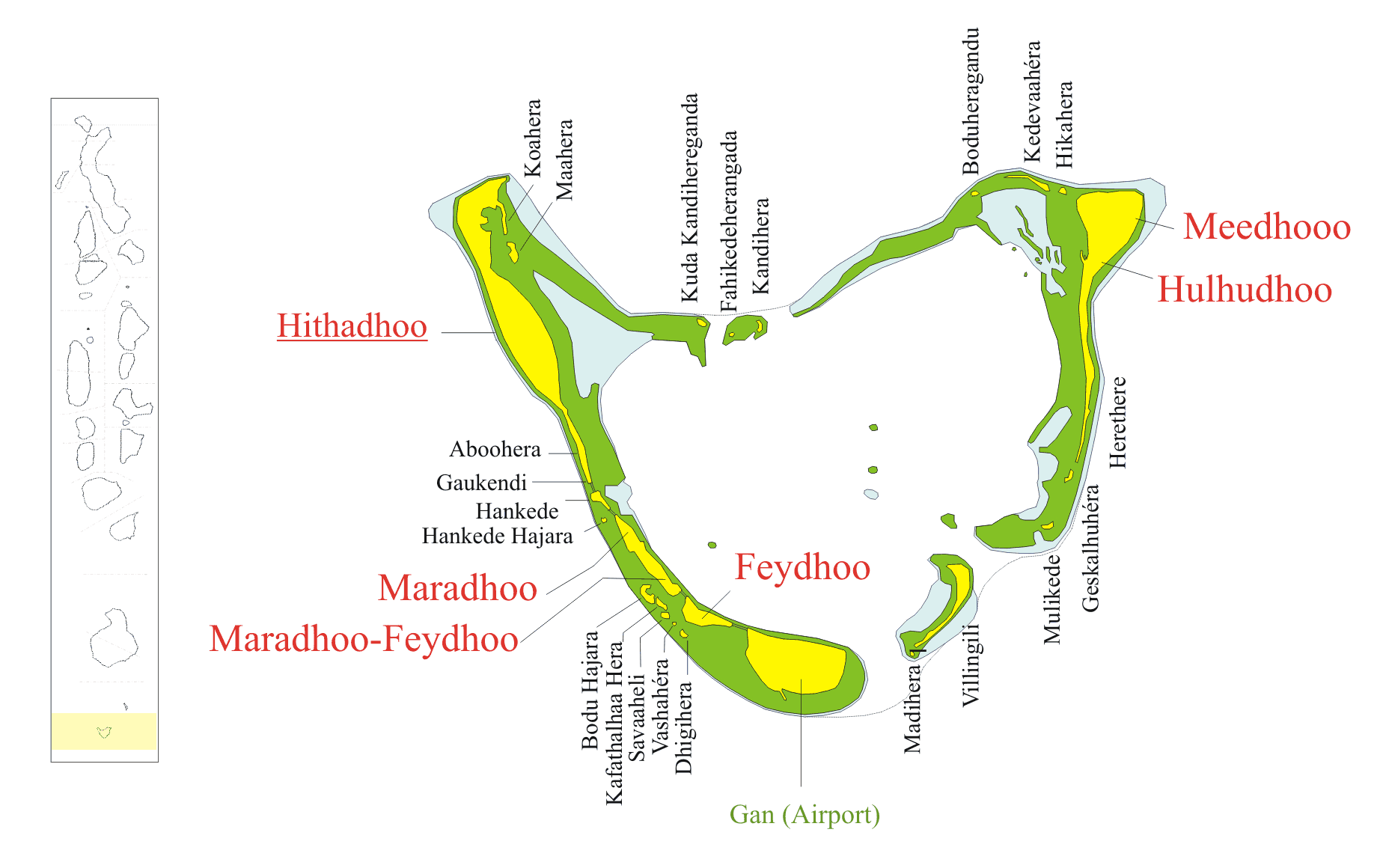
- Location within Addu Atoll Location within Maldives
- Coordinates: 00°40′25″S 73°07′30″E
- Country: Maldives
- Geographic atoll: Addu Atoll
- Established: 1970
- Founder: Katheeb Kaleyge
- Member of Parliament: Ismail Nizar

Government
  - Councilor: Ageel Mohamed (MDP)
  - Member for Women's Development Committee (WDC): Aishath Sheenaz MDP

Area
  - Total: 0.3136 km^{2} (0.1211 sq mi)

Dimensions
  - Length: 6.25 km (3.88 mi)
  - Width: 3.5 km (2.2 mi)

Population (2024)
  - Total: 1,954
  - Density: 6,231/km^{2} (16,140/sq mi)
- Time zone: UTC+05:00 (MST)
- Assigned Letter: 19050

Maradhoo-Feydhoo (Dhivehi: މަރަދޫފޭދޫ) is a district of Addu City, in the Maldives. The district borders the district of Maradhoo to the north, as they both share the same natural island, and the district of Feydhoo to the south. After Addu City became a city, Maradhoo-Feydhoo was extended to include the previous administrative island and a part of Feydhoo. The district has a village known as Feydhooburi (translates to 'North Feydhoo'). People still often refer to this village by the district's name.

== History ==
Prior to relocation in 1957, the area that is currently administered as Maradhoo-Feydhoo was forestlands on Maradhoo island.

Originally inhabitants of Feydhoo, the families of present-day Maradhoo-Feydhoo, have inhabited Addu for centuries. Local tales and writing, as well as more formal recorded history, are indicative of intermarriages between families of Meedhoo island and those of Feydhoo (which was then occupied by the ancestors of present-day Maradhoo-Feydhoo). A Feydhoo island chief during the mid-1800s, Katheeb Kaleyge (an honorific moniker that refers to his position) married Karankaleyge Mariyam, who is a descendant of Sultan Ali VII of the short-lived Isdhoo dynasty.

A 'Feydhoo Ganduvaru' (literally 'Feydhoo Palace') is also said to have existed, occupied by the family of one of Prince Abdulla's wives. Due to the prince's numerous marriages in the southern atolls (Huvadhoo, Fuvahmulah, and Addu), it is likely that this claim may have some merit.

Traditionally, all islands in the Maldives have been ruled by an island chief, or Katheeb (comes from the Arabic word 'Katib'), with authority vested by the Sultan to allocate land, adjudicate in disputes, lead prayer congregations and administer basic education. While not officially a hereditary position, in Feydhoo and later Maradhoo-Feydhoo, the position had been held by the same family for over two hundred years before the position was abolished countrywide by the Decentralisation Act in 2010, establishing democratically elected local councils for cities and rural areas.

Relocation for British Airforce Base

The inhabitants of Feydhoo island were transferred to neighbouring Maradhoo island under orders from the central government in Malé during the early 1970s so that the natives of Gan island could inhabit Feydhoo. This was part of then Prime Minister Ahmed Zaki's negotiations with British colonial powers, who had established a military base in the atoll.

The move was immensely unpopular with island inhabitants, and Feydhoo's chief magistrate at the time Ibrahin Futa (a descendant of Katheeb Kaleyge, who would later adopt the more modern name 'Ibrahim Anees', and become island chief of Maradhoo-Feydhoo) was detained by soldiers from the capital city. According to oral sources, Feydhoo residents were forcibly placed on boats and transferred to Maradhoo.

Those people were placed in the houses of Maradhoo inhabitants, and given handsome food rations by the Royal Air Force, before half the island was given to them. This area was later named Maradhoo-Feydhoo; a separate island office was built, and those relocated by the government were given lands in compensation.

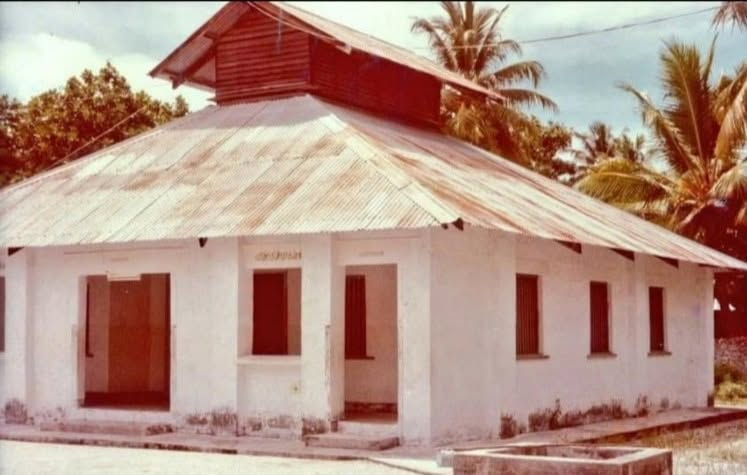
Masjidul Noor

Maradhoo-Feydhoo is today a district of the greater Addu City region, the second most populous urban centre in the Maldives.

== Geography ==
The district has a size of 0.103 km2 of this, 0.25 are on the island of Maradhoo with a population of 1100, 0.673 are on the island of Feydhoo (5200), and 0.13 are on islands between them.

Historical population
Year	Pop.	±%
2006	1,025	—
2014	1,158	+13.0%
2022	1,398	+20.7%
2024	1,954	+39.8%
2006-20014-2022-2024: Census populations Source:

== Sports ==
Maradhoo-Feydhoo is Home to many Sports Football, Futsal, Handball, Badminton

Clubs and Associations	Founded	Founder/Officials	Status
Civilzation Club	1973	Mohamed Waheed	Inactive
MAFSEA	2004 - 2009	Sadhir	Inactive
The Island Community (icom)	2007 - 2008	Ibrahim Moosa	Inactive
DYNAMO	2008 - 2012		Inactive
MARADHUFEYDHU	2015 - 2015		Inactive
MaradhooFeydhoo FC	2016 - 2016		Inactive
ELITE Sports	2022 - 2022	Mohamed Ali	Inactive
FC Afirin	2017 - 2023	Maseeh	Hiaus
United MaradhooFeydhoo Sports Club	2025 Present	Hussain Fazin	Active

== United Maradhoo-Feydhoo Sports Club - (MF United) ==
United Maradhoo-Feydhoo Sports Club
- Full name: United Maradhoo-Feydhoo Sports Club
- Nickname: MF United
- Founded: 2016; 10 years ago
- Stadium: Maradhoo Feydhoo Football Field
- Coordinates: -0.6767020952731042, 73.
- Co-Founders: Hussian Fahumy, Ahmed Jailam
- President: Huzam Naseem
- Head Coach: Ali Naushad (Ayya)
- League: FAM Atoll Championship
- Golden Futsal Challenge Unity Futsal Challenge: Seenu - Group Stage; Sem-final
- Website: www.umfsc.com
Home colours

United Maradhoo-Feydhoo Sports Club is Maldivian Sports Club based in Maradhoo-Feydhoo, Addu City, Maldives. The team competes in Golden Futsal Challenge, The Top Tier of the Maldivian Futsal Cup. Founded in 2016. Registerd in 2025

== History ==
Football in Maradhoo-Feydhoo began as informal matches between neighborhoods and schools, often played on sandy grounds. In the 1970s–1980s, island football culture started to grow when young men began forming more organized teams to compete against other islands in Addu Atoll.

== Home stadium ==
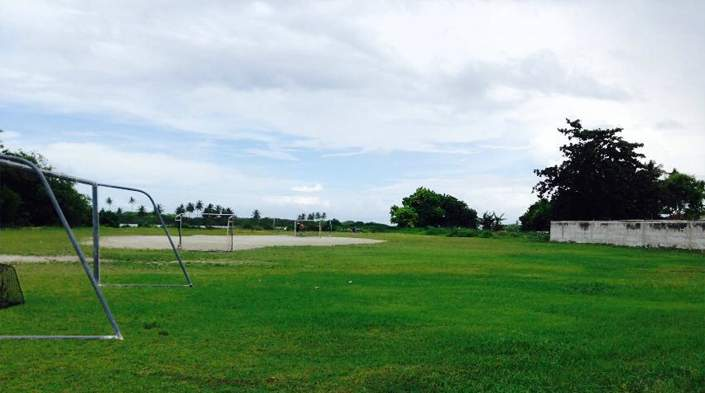
Old Maradhoofeydhoo Football Field till 2013

=== The History of Maradhoo-Feydhoo Football Ground: From a Lost 11-Side Field to Years of Youth Struggle ===
Maradhoo-Feydhoo once had a proper football ground used by the youth of the island for regular football activities. According to the concerns raised by local youth and later reported in local media, the island had a larger ground suitable for 11-side football. However, over the years, that ground became one of the biggest unresolved youth and sports issues in Maradhoo-Feydhoo.

The story of the Maradhoo-Feydhoo football ground is not only about a sports facility. It is also a story about land loss, road development, delayed promises, poor maintenance, flooding, political disagreements, and a generation of young footballers left without a proper place to train.

== The Road Project and the Loss of the Original Ground ==
The issue began around the time of the main road development project in Addu City. The road project connected S. Maradhoo, Maradhoo-Feydhoo and Feydhoo. Reports state that the road was built under free aid from the Sri Lankan government, amounting to US$11 million. The contractor for the road work was International Construction Consortium, known as ICC, a Sri Lankan company.

The practical road work started on 6 September 2012. According to reports at the time, the road was first expected to be completed by February, but the work was delayed due to bad weather. Addu City Council later said the road would be completed by April. The project included around five kilometres of asphalt road.

Although the road project was an important infrastructure development for Addu City, it had a serious effect on Maradhoo-Feydhoo's football ground. A later report by adduLIVE stated that a large part of the Maradhoo-Feydhoo football ground was taken when the main road was built under Sri Lankan government aid. This is the most important point in the history of the ground: Maradhoo-Feydhoo did not simply lose its football field because of neglect alone; a big part of the original ground was physically taken for the road.

After that, the remaining ground was no longer the same. The youth of Maradhoo-Feydhoo asked for the field to be rebuilt to its former size, but the council reportedly said that it could not be done because of lack of land space.

== A Smaller Ground With Bigger Problems ==
After part of the ground was taken for the road, the remaining football field became too small and difficult to use properly. One report described the Maradhoo-Feydhoo field as the smallest football ground among the wards of Addu.

The condition of the ground also became a major problem. Reports said that when it rained, water collected heavily inside the field. A youth who spoke to adduLIVE said that even a small amount of rain caused water to gather in the ground. This made football activities and tournaments very difficult.

At one stage, fencing and lights were installed around the field so that players could use it at night. However, the youth said this was not a complete solution. Their main concern was that the waterlogging and ground condition still needed to be fixed. The issue had been brought to the attention of the council and the Housing Ministry's Addu department, but the problem continued.

For the youth of Maradhoo-Feydhoo, the field was not just a piece of land. It was the only real space they had to practise, train and prepare for tournaments. Without a proper ground, the island's football development suffered.

== The 2013 MVR 1 Million Development Promise ==
On 29 May 2013, adduLIVE published a report titled “MVR 1 million for Maradhoo-Feydhoo field.” The report said that Maradhoo constituency councillor Abdulla Thoyyib, also known as Tom, announced that a project to develop the S. Maradhoo-Feydhoo football ground would cost MVR 1 million.

According to that report, the project would be funded from Addu City Council's own income. The first phase of the development was to include building a wall around the field, installing fencing and placing lights in the ground.

This announcement gave hope to the youth. After losing a large part of the original ground, and after facing flooding and poor field conditions, the MVR 1 million project appeared to be a possible solution.

== Contract Signed With Southern Maldives ==
A later report stated that Addu City Council signed an agreement with a company to develop the S. Maradhoo-Feydhoo football ground on a contract basis. The work was awarded to Southern Maldives, a company from Hithadhoo.

According to Councillor Abdulla Thoyyib, the agreement was signed between the council and the company. The project, funded from the council budget, included building the wall around the ground, cement works and installing lights. The work was planned to be completed within two months.

However, while the agreement showed progress on paper, the youth's problems did not end there.

== Delays, Unfinished Work and No Proper Place to Practise ==
Even after the wall, fence and light posts were installed, the ground was still not properly usable. A later report said that Maradhoo-Feydhoo youth had waited for more than two years for the field to be repaired and brought to a proper standard.

At the same time, teams across the Maldives were preparing for the Minivan 50 Football Championship. Maradhoo-Feydhoo also formed a team for the tournament, which was scheduled to begin on 15 September. But unlike teams from other islands and wards, Maradhoo-Feydhoo players did not have a proper ground to practise.

A Maradhoo-Feydhoo team official said they had met with the council, MRDC and officials from the Housing Ministry's department, but they did not see any result. Reports also said that the youth had discussions with MP Rozaina Adam, who represented the constituency, but even those discussions did not bring a clear solution.

The youth's biggest complaint was that although some work had been done around the ground, the field itself had not been properly filled, levelled and prepared for football. Stones and cement were present in parts of the ground, and the field could only be used properly after sand was added and the surface was levelled.

== The MRDC Quote and Political Disagreement ==
Reports said that the council had requested MRDC to carry out the levelling work. MRDC reportedly quoted MVR 225,000 for the work. According to information reported by adduLIVE, the work was delayed because the council considered the quoted price too high.

Maradhoo-Feydhoo youth believed that political differences between the council and Maldives Road Development Corporation were part of the reason the work was delayed. One youth was quoted as saying that the sand was taken from their own islands’ lagoon area and that the youth were even ready to do the work themselves, but they did not have the vehicles or resources needed.

This shows that the frustration was not only about football. It was also about the feeling that the youth were being ignored while a simple and important community need remained unsolved.

== The MVR 2,000 Assistance Controversy ==
During the Minivan 50 Championship period, another report said that MP Rozaina Adam gave MVR 2,000 to the Maradhoo-Feydhoo team. The team had requested assistance from her, but many people criticised the amount, saying it was not enough considering the real problem faced by the youth.

The report said that Maradhoo-Feydhoo youth had asked Rozaina not only for financial help, but for support in solving the football ground issue. Some people criticised her, while others defended her by saying that at least she gave some assistance when others did not.

This incident again showed the deeper issue: the youth did not only need small donations. They needed a permanent football ground solution.

== Administrative and Political Neglect ==
The football ground issue also connected to a wider concern about Maradhoo-Feydhoo's representation. One report said Maradhoo-Feydhoo was caught in administrative confusion. In local council elections, Maradhoo-Feydhoo voters were connected with Maradhoo. But in parliamentary elections, Maradhoo-Feydhoo was grouped with Meedhoo.

A Maradhoo-Feydhoo youth said this made it difficult for the island's issues to be properly represented. He said the island was linked from one side to Maradhoo and from the other side to Meedhoo, but there was no clear representative speaking only for Maradhoo-Feydhoo.

This feeling of being left behind was also seen in sports development. Reports said that the government had plans to build futsal grounds in other areas of Addu, but Maradhoo-Feydhoo was not included. Youth questioned why Maradhoo-Feydhoo was left out while other wards were receiving sports facilities.

== The Full Picture ==
Looking at the timeline, the history of the Maradhoo-Feydhoo football ground can be understood clearly.

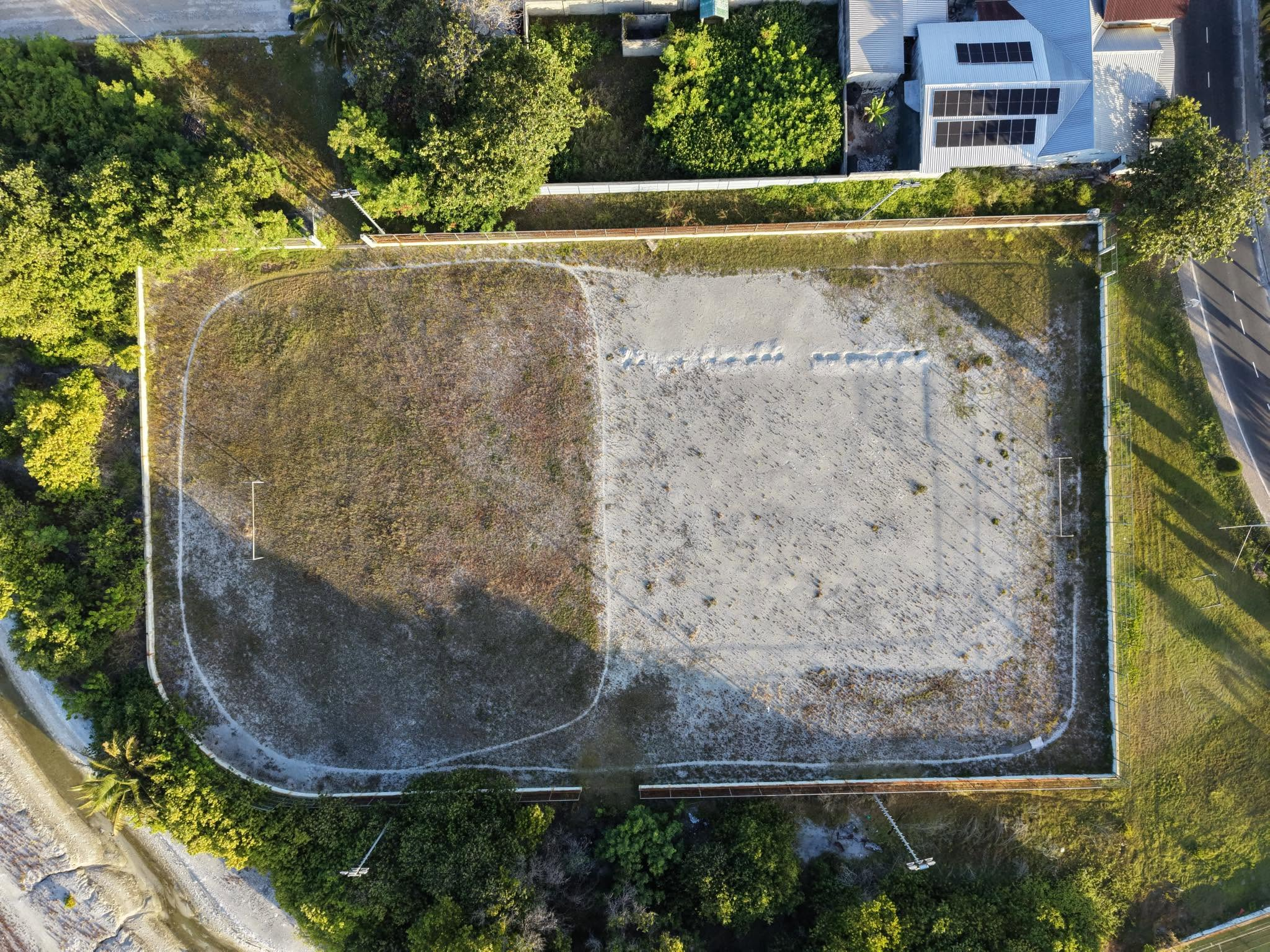
Maradhoofeydhoo Football Field in 2026

Before the road development, Maradhoo-Feydhoo had a larger football ground used by the youth. During the construction of the main road built under Sri Lankan government aid, a large part of that football ground was taken. After that, the remaining field became smaller, suffered from flooding, and was difficult to use for proper football. On 6 September 2012, the physical road work began. By 2013, the need to develop the remaining football ground had become serious. On 29 May 2013, a MVR 1 million project was announced to improve the ground, including walls, fencing and lighting. Later, Addu City Council signed with Southern Maldives to carry out the development work, with a planned completion period of two months.

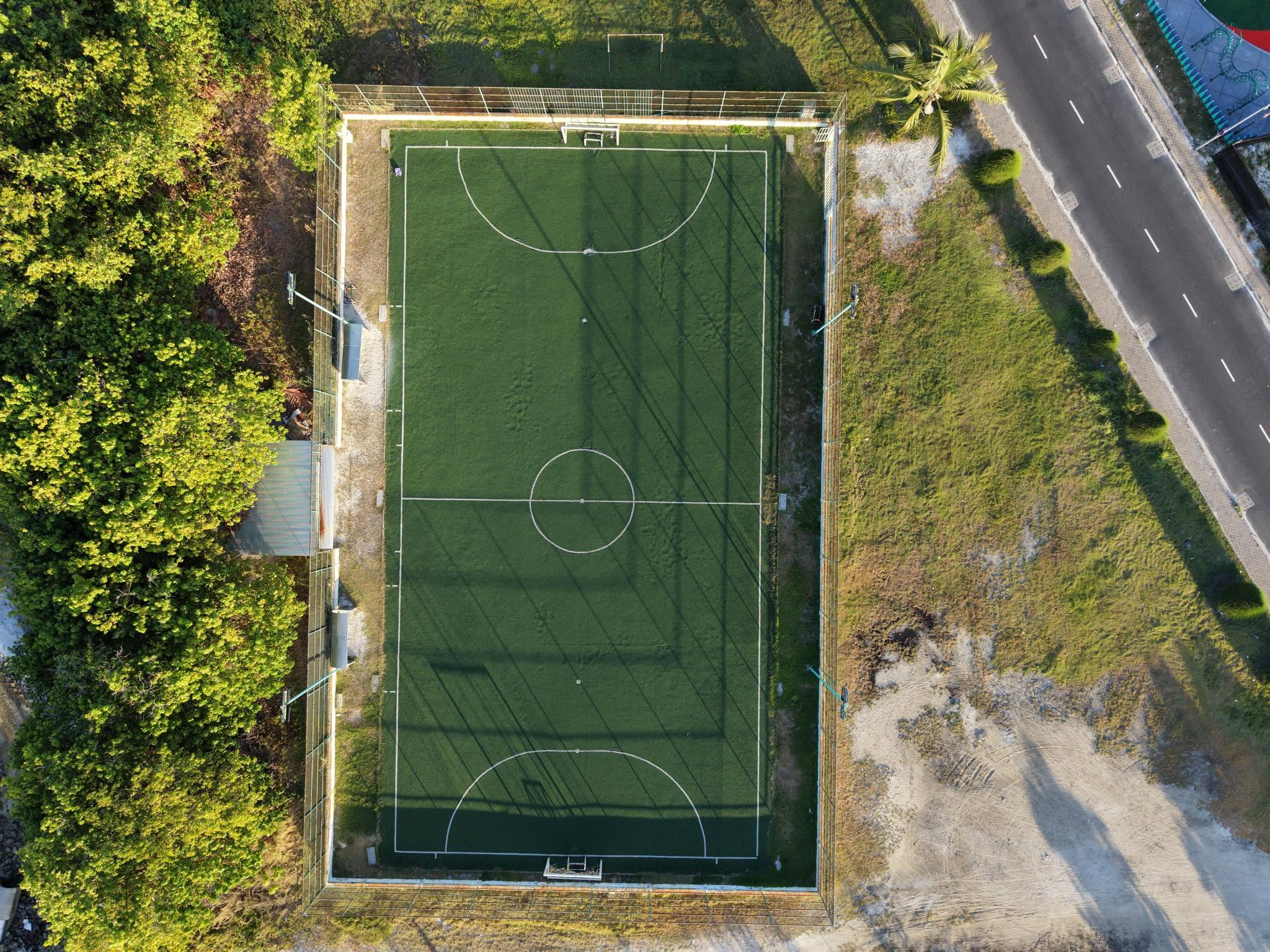
Maradhoofeydhoo Futsal Ground in 2026

But the main problem continued. The ground was still not properly filled or levelled. Water collected when it rained. Stones and cement made the surface unsuitable. Players preparing for tournaments, including the Minivan 50 Championship starting on 15 September, had no proper place to train. Meetings were held with the council, MRDC, Housing Ministry officials and elected representatives, but the youth continued to wait.

The Maradhoo-Feydhoo football ground issue is therefore not a small sports complaint. It is a long-running community issue that began with the loss of land during a major road project and continued through years of delay, poor maintenance and lack of proper representation.

=== Golden Futsal Challenge Cup ===
Golden Futsal Challenge record
Year	Result	Pld	W	D*	L	GF	GA
(Maldives) 2016	Atoll-Runner-up	2	0	1	1	1	6
(Maldives) 2023	Atoll-Runner-up	2	0	0	2	1	4
(Maldives) 2024	Group-Stage	3	1	1	1	5	5
(Maldives) 2025	Atoll-Semi-Final	3	0	2	1	5	6
(Maldives) 2026	Group-Stage	2	0	0	2	1	7
Total	Best:	12	1	4	7	13	28

=== GFC Goals Stats ===
Rank	Player	Goals	Caps	MOTM	Period
1	Ibrahim Saif	3	10	1	2023– present
2	Hassan Zaidhaan	3	10	1	2023–present
3	Ibrahim Alif Rashid	2	10	0	2023–present
4	Hussain Shamin	1	10	0	2023– present
5	Mifzal Latheef	1	4	0	2016-2023
6	Giyas Ibrahim	1	10	0	2023– present
7	Mohamed Saneem	1	12	0	2016–present
8	Ismail Abdulla	1	12	0	2016–present

=== Unity Futsal Challenge Cup ===
Unity Futsal Challenge record
Year	Result	Pld	W	D*	L	GF	GA
(Maldives) 2025	Semi-Final	4	2	0	2	8	15
(Maldives) 2026	Group-Stage	4	1	0	3	5	12
Total	Best:	8	3	0	5	13	27

=== Unity Top goalscorers ===
Rank	Player	Goals	Caps	KOTM	Period
1	Ismail Abdulla	3	4	1	2025—present
1	Ali Najah	3	4	0	2025–present
2	Ahmed Zayan Riyaz	2	3	0	2025–2025
2	Hussain Nizam	2	4	0	2025–2025
3	Mohamed Yazin Yasir	1	4	0	2025–present
4	Ibrahim Alif Rashid	1	4	0	2026—present

=== Kit ===
Kit supplier	Period
(Maldives) Yaal Sports	2016–2016
(Maldives) MALHI MV	2023–2023
(Maldives) Jerzia	2024–2024
(Maldives) HEPTA	2025–present

== Coaching-staff ==
Staff
Position	Name
Head Coach	Ali Naushad (Ayya)
Assistant Coach	Hussain Fahumy
Assistant Coach	Ahmed Jailam
Goalkeeping Coach	Hussain Zadhy

== Licensed Coaches ==
Name	Football
Mohamed Ali (Mode Coach)	AFC C Diploma
Hussian Fahumy (Fazin)	AFC C Diploma
Mohamed Imran	AFC C Diploma
Ahmed Jailam	AFC C Diploma

== Current Players ==
As of 4 January 2026

The following players are all-time Maradhoo-Feydhoo Squad List

Caps and goals are correct 02 December 2025,

No.	Pos.	Player	Date of birth (age)	Caps	Goals	Club
1	GK	Hussian Zadhy (Batta)	15 September 1985 (age 41)	8	0	(Football Association of Maldives) HILTON
26	GK	Ibrahim Aiham Wahaab (Aiham)	1 May 2004 (age 22)	0	0	(Football Association of Maldives) Without a Club
30	GK	Mohamed Navee Nazim (Navee)	11 October 2006 (age 20)	0	0	(Football Association of Maldives) Without a Club
12	DF	Mohamed' Ahmed (Paana) (Captain)	21 April 1988 (age 38)	7	0	(Football Association of Maldives) StatePharma
8	DF	Mohamed Saneem (Sani)	5 November 1988 (age 38)	8	1	(Football Association of Maldives) STORC
24	DF	Ahmed Reehan	3 September 1996 (age 30)	8	0	(Football Association of Maldives) Without a Club
9	DF	Ibrahim Alif Rashid (Afu)	20 March 1998 (age 28)	8	2	(Football Association of Maldives) Without a Club
15	DF	Giyas Ibrahim	14 January 1995 (age 31)	0	0	(Football Association of Maldives) One&Only
13	MF	Hussian Fahumy (Fazin)	2 January 1986 (age 40)	8	0	(Football Association of Maldives) FENAKA
17	MF	Ismail Abdulla (Issey)	20 March 1991 (age 35)	8	1	(Football Association of Maldives) Without a Club
2	MF	Mifzal Latheef	22 October 1989 (age 37)	1	0	(Football Association of Maldives) AVSECOM
4	MF	Ibrahim Alim	11 August 1996 (age 30)	2	0	(Football Association of Maldives) ANANTARA
11	MF	Mohamed Yazin Yasir	9 July 2005 (age 21)	8	0	(Football Association of Maldives) Without a Club
14	MF	Hussain Shamin (Shaana)	22 January 1991 (age 35)	0	0	(Football Association of Maldives) MNDF
18	MF	Ali Najaah (Najattey)	16 February 1989 (age 37)	8	0	(Football Association of Maldives) FENAKA
7	FW	Ibrahim Saif (Benjo)	28 February 1993 (age 33)	8	3	(Football Association of Maldives) NIYAMA
10	FW	Hassan Zaidhaan Mohamed Ali (Zidhan)	17 May 2003 (age 23)	8	3	(Football Association of Maldives) VELAA
9	FW	Mohamed Iyas Shahid (Kudey)	1 January 1997 (age 29)	0	0	(Football Association of Maldives) MPL
11	FW	Ibrahim Azin	26 March 2002 (age 24)	2	0	(Football Association of Maldives) KURAMATHI

== Participated Competitions ==
Type	Competitions	Titles	Seasons
Domestic	SIFA 1st Futsal Championship 2007	1	2007
Domestic	Zone Tournament 2008	1	2008
Domestic	Goadhiya	0	2009, 2010, 2012
Domestic	Street Soccer	0	2013, 2014
Domestic	Vaguthu Futsal Challenge	0	
Domestic	Unity Futsal Challenge	0	2025, 2026
Domestic	RedBull Winning 5	0	2015

Stats of All Competition
Club	Year	Division	PLD	W	D	L	GF	GA	RESULT
The Island Community	2007	SIFA 1st Futsal Championship 2007	1	1					Champions
The Island Community	2008	Zone Tournament 2008	1	1			3	2	Champions
DYNAMO	2008	Goadhiya - Kohler Roadha Futsal Hivvaru 2008							
DYNAMO	2009	Goadhiya - Kohler Roadha Futsal Hivvaru 2009	1						
MAFSEA	2009	Goadhiya - Kohler Roadha Futsal Hivvaru 2009							
DYNAMO	2010	Goadhiya - Kohler Roadha Futsal Hivvaru 2010	3		1	1	3	2	2nd Round Lost
DYNAMO	2012	Goadhiya - Kruger Roadha Futsal Hivvaru 2012							
MARADHUFEYDHU	2015	Mitsubishi - Goadhiya Futsal Cup 2015	4		1	3	5	10	Group Stage
MaradhooFeydhoo FC	2016	Betty Crocker - Goadhiya Futsal Cup 2016	4	3	0	1	6	6	Quarter Final
NEW MFC	2017	Goadhiya Futsal Cup 2017							
FC AFIRIN	2017	Goadhiya Futsal Cup 2017							
FC AFIRIN	2018	Goadhiya Futsal Cup 2018							
FC AFIRIN	2019	Mitsubishi - Goadhiya Futsal Cup 2019	3	1		2	7	13	Group Stage
MARADHOOFEYDHO FENAKA	2022	MARADHOOFEYDHOO Community Center Futsal Challenge 2022	4	3		1	17	9	Champions
ELITE SPORTS	2022	ADDU STreet Soccer 2022							
FC AFIRIN	2022	ADDU STreet Soccer 2022							
FC AFIRIN	2022	LOTHARI Street III THE REVAMP							
FC AFIRIN	2022	MTCC - Goadhiya Futsal Cup 2019	3			1		3	Group Stage
FC AFIRIN	2022	ADDU Football Championship 2022							
FC AFIRIN	2023	Marine Power- Goadhiya Futsal Cup 2023							
FC AFIRIN	2023	FC AFIRIN Futsal Challenge 2023							
FC AFIRIN	2023	The Feydhoo Veterans							
		Total							

== All Time Stats ==
As of 4 January 2026

Players	Status	Season	XI	Golden Futsal Challenge				Total		
Players	Status	Season	XI	Division	Apps	Assists	Goals	Apps	Assists	Goals
Mifzal Latheef	Retired	2016	XI	National	2	0	1			
Mifzal Latheef	Retired	2023	SUB	National	1	0	—			
Mifzal Latheef	Retired	Total						3	0	1
Hussain Fazin	Active	2016	XI	National	2	1	—			
Hussain Fazin	Active	2023	SUB	National	1	—	—			
Hussain Fazin	Active	2025	SUB	National	1	—	—			
Hussain Fazin	Active	2026		National	1	1	—			
Hussain Fazin	Active	Total						5	2	0
Ismail Abdulla	Active	2016	XI	National	1	—	—			
Ismail Abdulla	Active	2023	SUB	National	2	—	—			
Ismail Abdulla	Active	2025		National	3	—	1			
Ismail Abdulla	Active	2026		National						
Ismail Abdulla	Active	Total								
Hussain Zadhy (Batta)	Active	2016	XI	National	1	—	—			
Hussain Zadhy (Batta)	Active	2023	XI	National	1	—	—			
Hussain Zadhy (Batta)	Active	2025		National		—	—			
Hussain Zadhy (Batta)	Active	2026		National						
Hussain Zadhy (Batta)	Active	Total								
Mohamed Saneem (Sani)	Active	2016	XI	National	2	—	—			
Mohamed Saneem (Sani)	Active	2023	XI	National	2	1	—			
Mohamed Saneem (Sani)	Active	2024		National	3	1	—			
Mohamed Saneem (Sani)	Active	2025		National	3	1	—			
Mohamed Saneem (Sani)	Active	2026		National						
Mohamed Saneem (Sani)	Active	Total						10	3	0
Mohamed Shafiu	Retired	2016	XI	National	1	—	—			
Mohamed Shafiu	Retired	2023	XI	National	1	—	—			
Mohamed Shafiu	Retired	Total			2			2	—	—
Mohamed Ahmed	Active	2023	XI	National	2					
Mohamed Ahmed	Active	2024		National	3	1	0			
Mohamed Ahmed	Active	2025		National						
Mohamed Ahmed	Active	2026		National						
Mohamed Ahmed	Active	Total								
Ibrahim Saif	Active	2023	XI	National						
Ibrahim Saif	Active	2024		National						
Ibrahim Saif	Active	2025		National						
Ibrahim Saif	Active	2026		National						
Ibrahim Saif	Active	Total								
Hussain Shamin		2023		National						
Hussain Zaidhaan		2023		National						
Ibrahim Azin		2023		National						
Ibrahim Alif Rashid		2024		National						
Giyas Ibrahim		2024		National						
Ahmed Reehan		2024		National						
		Total								
Club Career total										

=== Notable players ===
- Mohamed Ali: Respected player, key in many tournaments.Only player from the island to compete in the Maldives 1st Division Football League.
