= Ibrahim Mahudhee =

Maldivian footballer

Personal information
- Full name: Ibrahim Mahudhee Hussain
- Date of birth: 22 August 1993 (age 33)
- Place of birth: S. Feydhoo, Maldives
- Position: Striker

Team information
- Current team: Maziya S&RC
- Number: 7

Senior career*
Years	Team	Apps	(Gls)
2015–2016	S. Feydhoo	0	(0)
2017–2018	TC Sports	0	(0)
2019–2022	Maziya	7	(7)
2022–2026	Club Eagles	18	(8)
2026–	Maziya		

International career^{‡}
2017–	Maldives	17	(3)
Medal record
Representing Maldives
SAFF Championship
Winner	2018 Bangladesh
- * Club domestic league appearances and goals as of 12/12/24 @ 17:49(AEST) ‡ National team caps and goals as of 15 June 2021

Ibrahim Mahudhee Hussain (born 22 August 1993) is a Maldivian professional footballer who plays as a striker for Maziya S&RC and the Maldives national team.

== Club career ==
He started his football career at his boyhood club F.C. Habeys, leading them to glory in various tournaments in which he played. This lead him to represent S. Feydhoo at Zone level in Minivan Championship, before joining TC Sports in 2017.

== International career ==
Mahudhee was first called up for Maldives national football team in March 2017 for 2019 AFC Asian Cup qualification match against Palestine at home, but was on bench as an unused substitute. He made his debut against Palestine on 14 November 2017, in the 2019 AFC Asian Cup qualification match away from home. He came in as a 66th minute substitute for Ahmed Rizuvan.

=== International goals ===
Scores and results list Maldives' goal tally first.

No	Date	Venue	Opponent	Score	Result	Competition
1.	23 March 2018	National Stadium, Kallang, Singapore	Singapore	2–3	2–3	Friendly
2.	15 September 2018	Bangabandhu National Stadium, Dhaka, Bangladesh	India	1–0	2–1	2018 SAFF Championship
3.	5 September 2019	Guam F.A. National Training Center, Dededo, Guam	Guam	1–0	1–0	2022 FIFA World Cup qualification
4.	9 November 2021	Colombo Racecourse, Colombo, Sri Lanka	Sri Lanka	3–0	4–4	2021 Four Nations Football Tournament
5.	24 March 2022	National Football Stadium, Malé, Maldives	Bangladesh	2–0	2–0	Friendly
6.	17 December 2022	Jalan Besar Stadium, Kallang, Singapore	Singapore	1–1	1–3	Friendly
7.	6 September 2025	Colombo Racecourse, Colombo, Sri Lanka	Sri Lanka	2–0	3–0	Friendly

== Honours ==
Maldives

- SAFF Championship: 2018
