= MDP =

MDP may refer to:

== Medicine and psychology ==
- MDP syndrome, a rare genetic disorder
- Manic depressive psychosis, also known as bipolar disorder
- Mesolimbic dopamine pathway of the brain
- Methylene diphosphonate, a pharmaceutical product used especially in nuclear medicine (^{99m}Tc-MDP)
- Muramyl dipeptide, a component of bacterial cell walls with inflammatory properties
- 10-Methacryloyloxydecyl dihydrogen phosphate, an adhesive monomer for dental adhesive materials
- A brand name for the medication medronic acid
- Monocyte Dendritic-cell Progenitors, a type of progenitor cell

== Organizations ==
- Madison Dearborn Partners, an American private equity firm
- Malaysian Democratic Party, a Malaysian political party
- Maldivian Democratic Party, a Maldivian political party
- Maendeleo Democratic Party, a Kenyan political party
- Maryland Department of Planning, a state agency of Maryland
- Michigan Democratic Party, an American political party
- Microbicides Development Programme, a British organization that studies microbicides
- Ministry of Defence Police, a British civilian police force
- Modernising Defence Programme, the United Kingdom’s Ministry of Defence's strategic initiative in 2018
- Montana Democratic Party, an American political party
- Movement for Democracy and Progress (Comoros), a politic party in the Comoros
- Movement for Democracy and Progress (Republic of the Congo), a political party in the Republic of the Congo
- Democratic Party (South Korea, 2000), formerly known as the Millennium Democratic Party
- Hungarian Working People's Party (Hungarian: Magyar Dolgozók Pártja), the ruling communist party in Hungary between 1949 and 1956
- Meredith Corporation (NYSE: MDP), an American media conglomerate
- Nationalist Democracy Party (Turkish: Milliyetçi Demokrasi Partisi), a Turkish political party
- Portuguese Democratic Movement (Portuguese: Movimento Democrático Português)
- Article 1 – Democratic and Progressive Movement (Italian: Articolo 1 – Movimento Democratico e Progressista), an Italian political party

== Science and engineering ==
- Minimum Desirable Product, a product with enough features to be desirable for most customers (a stage that follows the Minimum Viable Product)
- Markov decision process, a probabilistic model that is widely used in artificial intelligence
- Mask data preparation, a process in electronic design automation
- Media Dispatch Protocol, a file transfer protocol
- Membrane dipeptidase, an enzyme
- Mini DisplayPort, a digital display interface

== Other uses ==
- Management Development Programme, a middle-management form of MBA
- Mbala language (ISO 639 code: mdp), a Bantu language
- Medibang Paint, abbreviation and filetype (.mdp) of a graphics editor.
