= HMS Guardian (1932) =

1932 net laying ship

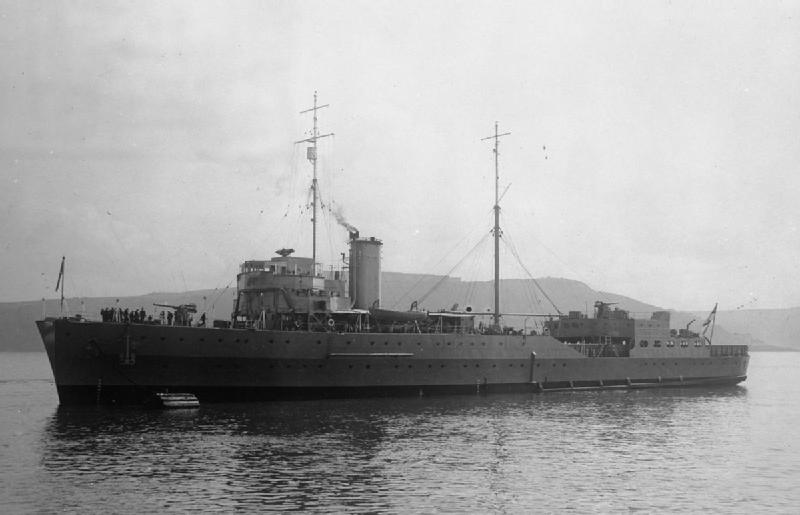
- HMS Guardian in 1934

History

United Kingdom
- Name: HMS Guardian
- Builder: Chatham Dockyard
- Cost: £333,595
- Laid down: 15 October 1931
- Launched: 1 September 1932
- Commissioned: 13 June 1933
- Decommissioned: 1 January 1962
- Fate: Scrapped, 1962

General characteristics
- Type: Net laying ship
- Displacement: 2,860 long tons (2,906 t)
- Length: 103.02 m (338 ft 0 in)
- Beam: 16.15 m (53 ft 0 in)
- Draught: 4.22 m (13 ft 10 in)
- Propulsion: 2 × steam turbines; 2 × boilers; 6,500 shp (4,847 kW)
- Speed: 18 knots (33 km/h; 21 mph)
- Complement: 181
- Armament: 2 × QF 4 inch Mk V naval guns

HMS Guardian was a net laying ship of the Royal Navy, launched in 1932 and scrapped in 1962. She was also equipped for target towing and gunnery photography. A second net-layer, HMS Protector, was built to a modified design. Launched in 1936 Protector was scrapped in 1970.

== Service history ==
Guardian was ordered as part of the 1930 naval programme, the first purpose built netlayer for the Royal Navy. She was laid down at Chatham Dockyard on 15 October 1931, was launched on 1 September 1932 and completed on 13 June 1933.

Guardian served in the Indian Ocean between 1941 and 1942. She took part in the invasion of Madagascar and helped build a base in the Maldives at Addu Atoll in 1942 in case Ceylon fell into Japanese hands. She also built two more bases for the protection of merchant ships assembling for convoys: one was near Mombasa and the other near Cape Town. Guardian then returned to Gibraltar and took part in the invasion of Algeria at Oran (Mers-el-Kebir) in 1942. Afterwards, she returned to Belfast for a refit and the fitting of additional anti-aircraft weaponry. Later, she took part in the invasions of Sicily (Operation Husky) and Italy.

In 1952, Guardian was taken out of the Reserve Fleet storage on the River Tamar between Devonport and Saltash and towed to Newport for a refit and modernisation, which was completed in 1954. She was then mothballed and returned to rejoin the reserve fleet at Plymouth.
