= RAF Gan =

Former Royal Air Force station in the Maldives

- Gan island, Addu Atoll, Maldives
- Motto: En Route

Site information
- Type: Military
- Owner: Ministry of Defence
- Operator: Royal Air Force (RAF)

Location
- Location on Addu Atoll in the Maldives RAF Gan (Indian Ocean)
- Coordinates: 00°41′29″S 073°09′22″E

Site history
- Built: 1957; 69 years ago
- In use: 1957–1 April 1976; 50 years ago

Airfield information
- Identifiers: IATA: GAN, ICAO: VRMG
- Elevation: 2 metres (6 ft 7 in) AMSL
Runways
Direction	Length and surface
10/28	2,650 metres (8,690 ft) concrete
- Information correct during operational period by the Royal Air Force

Royal Air Force Gan, commonly known as RAF Gan, is a former Royal Air Force station on Gan island, the southern-most island of Addu Atoll, which is part of the larger groups of islands which form the Maldives, in the middle of the Indian Ocean. Its motto is En Route, which signifies its importance as a strategic staging post for enabling RAF aircraft to reach their onward destinations at their bases in the Far East.

Following the departure of the Royal Air Force (RAF) in 1976, the former RAF Gan airfield was developed into a civilian airport, and is now known as Gan International Airport.

== History ==
The area was originally established as a military base for the Royal Navy (RN) in 1941; 85 years ago. In response to the threat posed by the Japanese advance, the Admiralty devised a plan for the relocation of the Eastern Fleet to a secure fallback harbor. Addu fulfilled the criteria. Work commenced in 1941 to covertly establish a fleet anchorage and base referred to as Port 'T'.

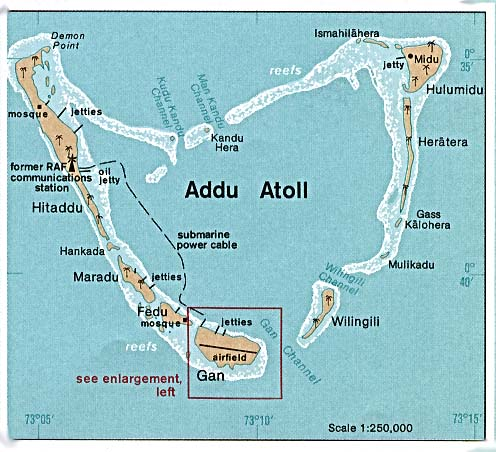
Map of Addu Atoll, Maldives, in the Indian Ocean

An airfield was projected to be operational by mid-May 1942, with the Island of Gan selected as the site. Royal Marines engineers began constructing airstrips on Gan island from crushed coral in August 1941 for the Fleet Air Arm (FAA). The inhabitants of Gan and the neighbouring island of Feydhoo were relocated to the Maamendhoo region of Hithadhoo.

Port 'T' was adequately prepared to commence operations by January 1942. On 22 February 1942, HMS Haitian reached Addu Atoll and all personnel assigned to the facilities on the Atoll were now on her accounts.

=== RNAS Addu Atoll ===
Royal Naval Air Station Addu Atoll (RNAS Addu Atoll) was intended to provide accommodation for disembarked Fighter Squadrons with capacity for twenty-four aircraft. The runways were primarily constructed by hand. The initial phase consisted of extracting the upper layer of loose soil, followed by the placement of lump coral. Subsequently, 0.5 feet (0.15 m) of 2 inches (51 mm) coral was added, which was then topped with sand and coral dust. After this mixture was thoroughly rolled and watered, a final layer of pea coral was applied. The outcome was a solid, level surface capable of accommodating the landing of a fully loaded Liberator heavy bomber.

The airfield was operational between 1942 and 20 March 1945, as a secondary base for Trincomalee, Ceylon. It was part of HMS Haitan which became HMS Maraga.

The Eastern Fleet ultimately had to retreat from its main bases in 1942, opting to relocate to Kilindini instead. Consequently, the significance of Addu Atoll began to diminish. Additionally, the naval air station became unnecessary, leading to the suspension of construction activities in January 1944. However, on 1 February, the entire Addu Atoll naval facility was officially commissioned as HMS Maraga.

The RAF’s 160 Squadron occasionally made stops at the air station, with detachments of Liberator B Mk.V during 1943 and Liberator B Mk.VI in 1944. and 217 Squadron in 1943 with Beaufort Mk.I torpedo bomber. Following their departure, the facility was available solely for emergency use until it was downgraded to Care and Maintenance status on 29 March 1945. HMS Maraga was decommissioned on 28 February 1946, with the facilities being reclassified as a refuelling station and RAF observation centre. In 1957, the Royal Navy transferred control of the airfield to the Royal Air Force.

=== Royal Air Force ===
During the Second World War, in 1942, the Royal Air Force (RAF) had its bases in the islands of Addu Atoll, Maldives. The RAF first had a presence on Hithadoo in 1942, when a detachment of RAF personnel were sent from RAF China Bay in Ceylon to service and turn around the RAF Short Sunderland and Consolidated PBY Catalina flying boats that were flying regularly into the Addu Atoll lagoon. At the end of the war, all military installations were either removed or abandoned.

In 1956–57, at the request of SWRD Bandaranaike, the Royal Air Force handed over its bases in Ceylon to the Royal Ceylon Air Force. The loss of RAF Negombo meant that a replacement staging post was needed between its bases in the Middle East and Far East, and the location was virtually limited to Gan. Hence Royal Air Force Station Gan became established in the late 1950s as a stopover on the reinforcement route to the Far East Air Force based in Singapore. The previous reinforcement route had passed through countries that had formerly been British territory, but were now independent, and sometimes hostile nations. RAF Mauripur, to the west of Karachi, by then a Pakistan Air Force station, had RAF personnel attached for staging airfield purposes until 1956, when the staging role between the Middle East and Far East fell to RAF Gan.

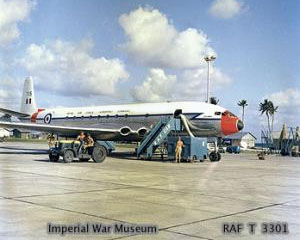
A de Havilland Comet Mk 2 (XK715) of RAF Transport Command resupplying at RAF Gan

It was extensively used as a staging post by bombers, fighters, and transports, on their way to Singapore and other destinations in east Asia during the late 1950s and the 1960s. Other foreign military forces occasionally used the facilities. However, as the 1970s dawned, the United Kingdom was withdrawing from its commitments east of Suez. By the end of 1971, the RAF Far East Air Force was disbanded, and the major rationale for Gan was gone. Traffic was now much less frequent, but the base still remained open for a few more years. By 1975, extremely few British military aircraft used the base, and it was closed. On 1 April 1976, the entire island with its airfield was handed back to the Maldivian Government. At the same time as RAF use of the airfield ceased, the RAF gained access to the newly built airfield 200 miles (320 kilometres) to the south of Gan on the British Indian Ocean Territory (BIOT) island of Diego Garcia. In 1977 the Soviet Union requested use of the Gan airbase, but this was denied by President Ibrahim Nasir, who wanted the Maldives to remain neutral.

The base was used by No. 1125 Marine Craft Unit between 1 May 1970 and 29 March 1976.

== RAF Gan today ==
Following the handover back to the Maldivian Government, the island was left to fall into disrepair for many years, but as funds allowed the airfield was subtly developed into a civil airport now known as Gan International Airport. Most of the base is now a tourist resort called Equator Village: the former military buildings remain and have been converted into rooms and other facilities on the resort. The former military hospital is now a dive centre.

== See also ==
- RAF Hithadhoo – communications site for RAF Gan
- List of former Royal Air Force stations
