= Maradhoo =

Maradhoo މަރަދޫ
- District of Addu City
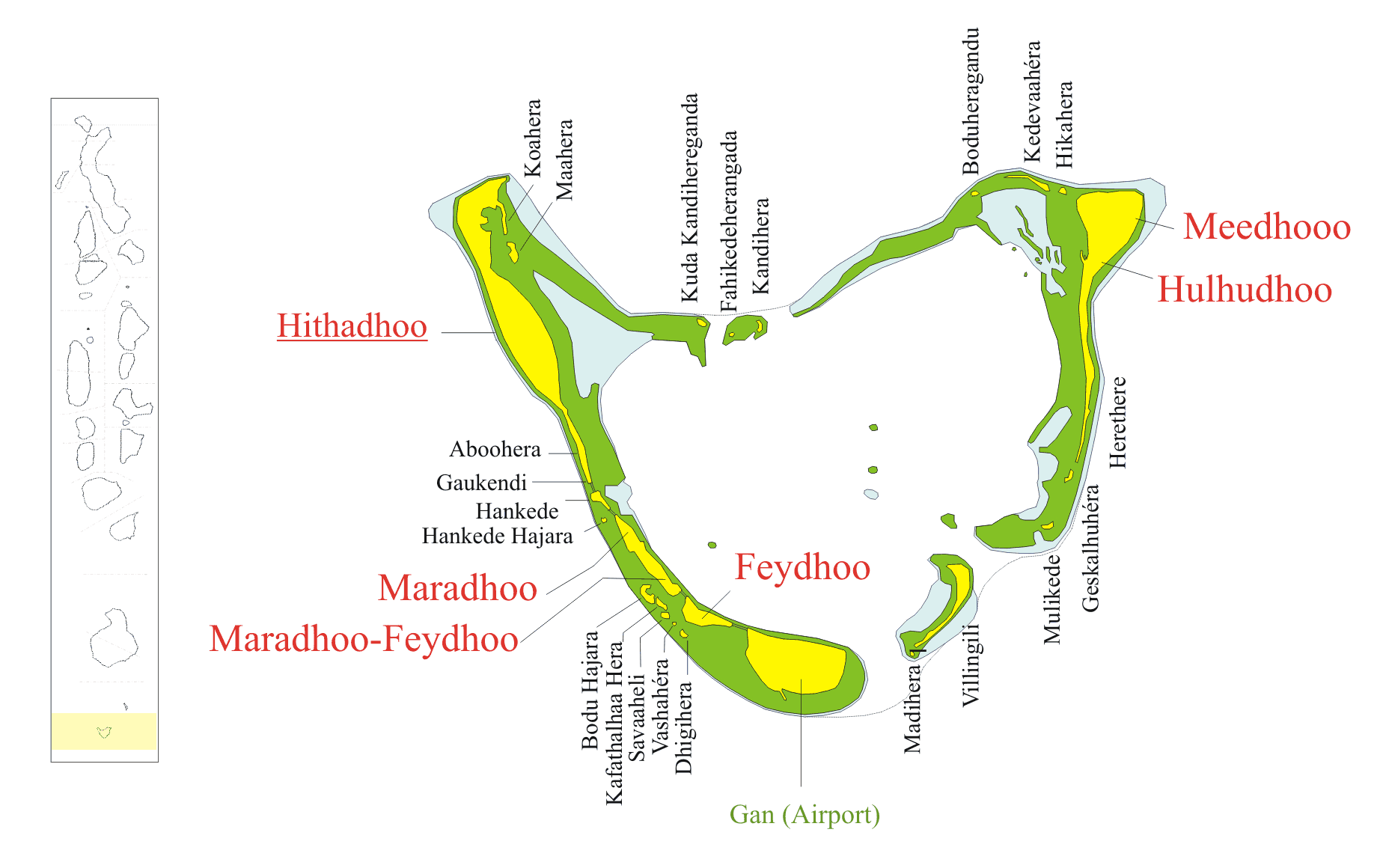
- Location in Addu Atoll Maradhoo (Maldives)
- Coordinates: 00°40′S 073°07′E
- Country: Maldives
- Geographic atoll: Addu Atoll
- Administrative atoll: Addu City
- Distance to Malé: 537.18 km (333.79 mi)

Area
  - Total: 0.926 km^{2} (0.358 sq mi)

Dimensions
  - Length: 1.575 km (0.979 mi)
  - Width: 0.50 km (0.31 mi)

Population (2024)
  - Total: 3,885
  - Density: 4,200/km^{2} (10,900/sq mi)
- Time zone: UTC+05:00 (MST)

Maradhoo (Dhivehi: މަރަދޫ) is one of the inhabited islands of the Addu Atoll (also known as Seenu Atoll).

== Overview ==
Maradhoo is located in the middle of the island chain on the Western side of Addu City. To the North are Hankede followed by Hithadhoo's Gaukendi, Rujjehera, Abuhera, RAF, Maamendhoo and Mainland Hithadhoo. To the South are Maradhoo-Feydhoo, Feydhoo and Gan island. The island is 537.18 km (334 mi; 290 nmi) south of the country's capital, Malé. It has a population of 3289 and is ranked 17th in terms of population in Maldives. Mardhoo's location makes it strategically important for the atoll as the main bridging point between the main industrial island Gan and the atoll's administrative capital Hithadhoo. Maradhoo is a larger island in Maldivian terms. The southern part, towards Feydhoo, has a separate administrative division and is regarded as a separate island named Maradhoo-Feydhoo, even though it is physically attached to Maradhoo island itself.

Maradhoo's landscape mainly features palm trees and tropical shrubs as in other islands in Addu Atoll. The island consists of small roads, close lanes, large number of closely built houses, only a few have a second floor. Green vegetation surrounds most of the housing compounds, especially coconut palm and banana trees, and are regarded as part domestic agriculture.

Maradhoo has four wards and 2 districts:

- Maradhoo District: the north towards Hankede is called Venbolhofushi (which is geographically a separate island) pop ~ 1200
- Maradhoo District: the central area is called Egganburi, pop ~ 1400
- Maradhoo District: further south is called Valiburi, pop ~ 1200
- Maradhoo-Feydhoo District: to the southeast is feydhooburi, now known as Maradhoo-Feydhoo pop 1100.

NOTE:Though wards are known to common like this, since old times the official names were RANDHOO(valiburi) and MAARANDHOO(egganburi)

The northeast end of the island is a place of historical importance, where the British navy had a major slipway and marine maintenance base. This area is now being used by a private company as a slipway and serves as a major maintenance and docking center for Dhonis, Ships and other sea-going vessels throughout the atoll as well as nearby atolls. In fact it is the only such facility in the atoll. Another significant structure is Bondoge ( literally meaning 'Big house'), which was used as a criminal detention center by British RAF forces during and after the second world war. After the RAF left Addu Atoll, Bondoge was used as a theater by locals and is now an administrative building containing a Kids Club called Club Goadhiyya. This building stands as the largest building in the island.

Maradhoo is the main fishing village in the atoll and supplies fish to nearby Maradhoo-Feydhoo and Feydhoo. Maradhoo also has good house reef with plenty of varieties of fish and multi-colored corals and is a famous diving point for divers who come to Addu Atoll. Maradhoo Inside is a place in the interior atoll, before the island Maradhoo.

== Demography ==
Historical population
Year	Pop.	±%
2014	2,195	—
2022	2,542	+15.8%
2024	3,885	+52.8%
2014-2022-2024: Census populations Source:

== Tourism ==
Tourism development at Addu City, after the presidential elections in 2008 there is a free opportunity to invest in the tourism industry.

The fourth president of Maldives “Mohamed Nasheed” gives the possibility for the Addu citizens, foreign investors to start at "local" Islands guesthouses, hotels, resorts, dive,- & watersport centers and other tourism related companies at Addu City.

Addu city will be a “non typical” Maldivian tourist place where tourists can spend their time in a local environment and can explore the Maldivian way of living.

Addu City "local Islands" is open for tourism and there are new tourism investment projects going on, to develops "local" Addu City in a new holiday destination in the Maldives.

Gan International Airport will be open in 2013 for International flights.
