= Gan International Airport =

Gan International Airport ގަން ބައިނަލްއަޤްވާމީ ވައިގެބަނދަރު
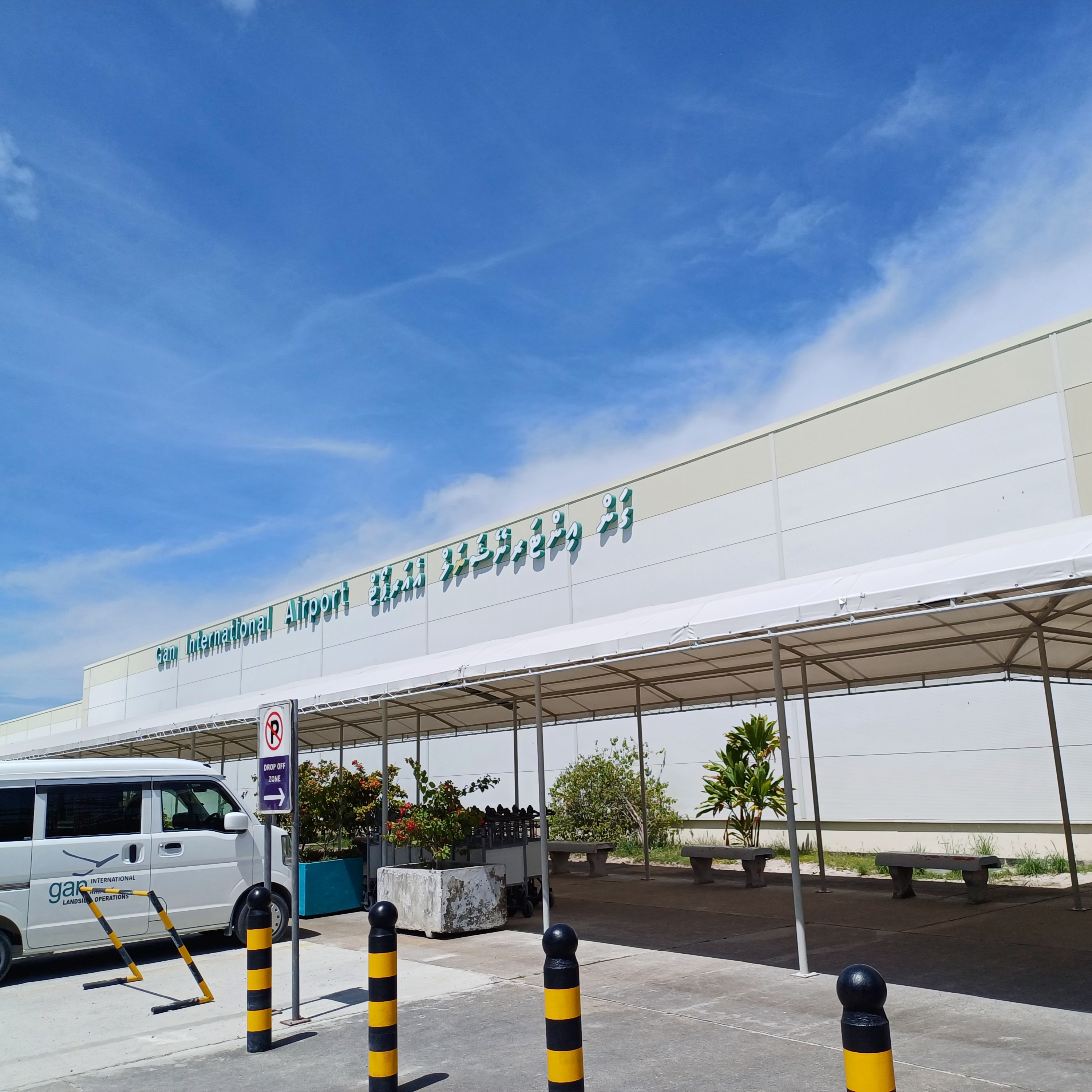
- Front view of GIA
- IATA: GAN; ICAO: VRMG

Summary
- Airport type: Public
- Owner/Operator: Addu International Airport Private Limited
- Serves: Addu City, Maldives
- Location: Gan, Addu City
- Time zone: Maldives Time (MVT) (UTC+5)
- Elevation AMSL: 2 m (6.6 ft)
- Coordinates: 00°41′36″S 073°09′20″E
- Website: GanAirport.com

Maps
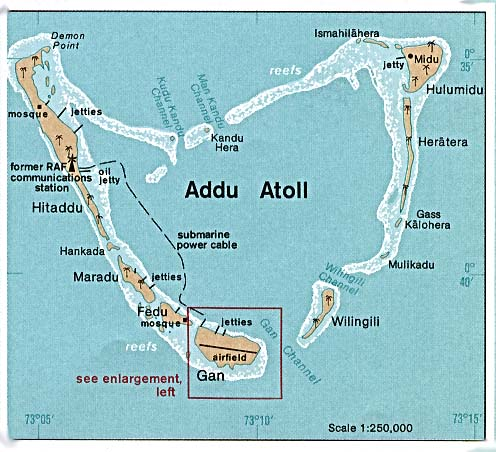
- Map of Addu Atoll in 1976 showing Gan and airfield

- Location of airport in Gan, Maldives GAN/VRMG (Indian Ocean)

Runways
Direction	Length		Surface
Direction	m	ft	Surface
10/28	3,600	11,811	concrete
- Sources: Government of Maldives, DAFIF

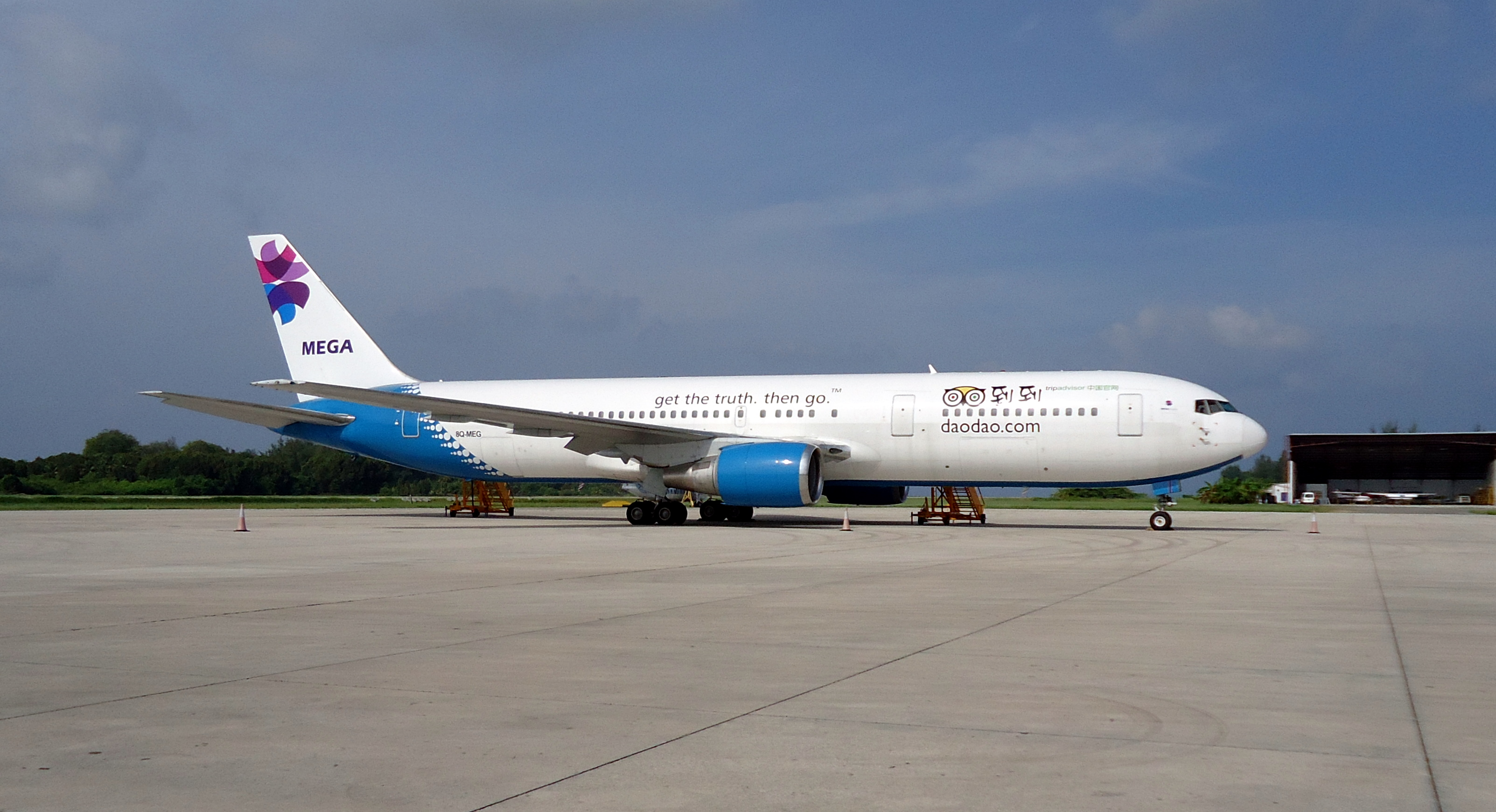
Former Mega Maldives Boeing 767 on Gan International Airport parking apron, February 2011

Gan International Airport (GIA) (IATA: GAN, ICAO: VRMG) is an international airport located on the island of Gan in Addu Atoll (sometimes known as Seenu Atoll) in the island nation of the Maldives. As of June 2024, it is one of five international airports in the Maldives.

== History ==
First built by the Royal Navy (RN) for its Fleet Air Arm (FAA), it was subsequently transferred to the Royal Air Force (RAF), becoming Royal Air Force Station Gan or RAF Gan. It was a British military airbase until 1976, used as a staging post for RAF aircraft flying to the Far East during World War II. The first aircraft, an RAF Westland Walrus biplane, landed on the crushed coral runway of Gan on 8 February 1943.

In 1976, the RAF left Gan, having no further need for its facilities, and handed it over to the Maldives government. The island and airfield was left to fall into disrepair for many years. Funding was subsequently found to develop the island, and RAF Gan became a civilian domestic airport.

== Current use ==
Gan Airport (in its civilian incarnation) was originally run by the Government of Maldives (GoM), with technical assistance from Maldives Airports Company Limited (MACL) until January 2010. In June 2009, a public enterprise by the name of Gan Airport Company Limited (GACL) was established by President Mohamed Nasheed as part of GoM's privatization policy. GACL took over management of Gan Airport in January 2010.

To promote tourism and other economic activity in the south Maldives, a venture was formed early in 2012 to further develop and expand Gan Airport to international airport standards. A joint venture was formed by GACL, MACL, and State Trading Organization Plc (STO). Renaming to Gan International Airport (GIA), the venture, Addu International Airport Private Limited (AIA), owns and manages Gan International Airport. STO sold all of its shares of the airport in February 2020. As of June 2024, 70% of AIA is held by the government of Maldives, and 30% by KASA Holdings Private Limited.

In 2023, Renaatus Projects Pvt Ltd signed a contract with AIA to expand the airport to include bigger passenger terminals, fire station, parking lots, cargo facilities, restaurants and duty-free shops, control tower.

== Facilities ==
Gan International Airport is capable of accommodating ICAO code 4E aircraft. The airport lies at an elevation of 6 feet (2 metres) above mean sea level. It has one paved runway designated 10/28, with a concrete surface, previously measuring 2,651 by 45 metres (8,698 by 148 feet) in 2010. During the National Development Plan of the early 1980s, Gan runway was subsequently upgraded and extended in length by 980 metres (3,215 feet) to 3,600 by 45 metres (11,811 by 148 feet).

== Airlines and destinations ==
As of June 2024, the following airlines offer regularly scheduled services:

Airlines	Destinations
Maldivian	Fuvahmulah, Kaadedhdhoo, Kooddoo, Kulhudhuffushi, Malé
SriLankan Airlines	Colombo–Bandaranaike

== Statistics ==
As of April 2024, the only foreign operator to Gan is SriLankan Airlines using Airbus A320 aircraft.

== Accidents and incidents ==
- On 12 March 2019, a Maldivian Bombardier Dash 8 Q300 suffered a landing gear malfunction, due to which the plane circled around the airport for one hour. The aircraft landed safely, but the landing gear was not fully retracted. This was the first incident to occur at Gan International Airport.
