= Feydhoo (Addu Atoll) =

Feydhoo ފޭދޫ
- District of Addu City
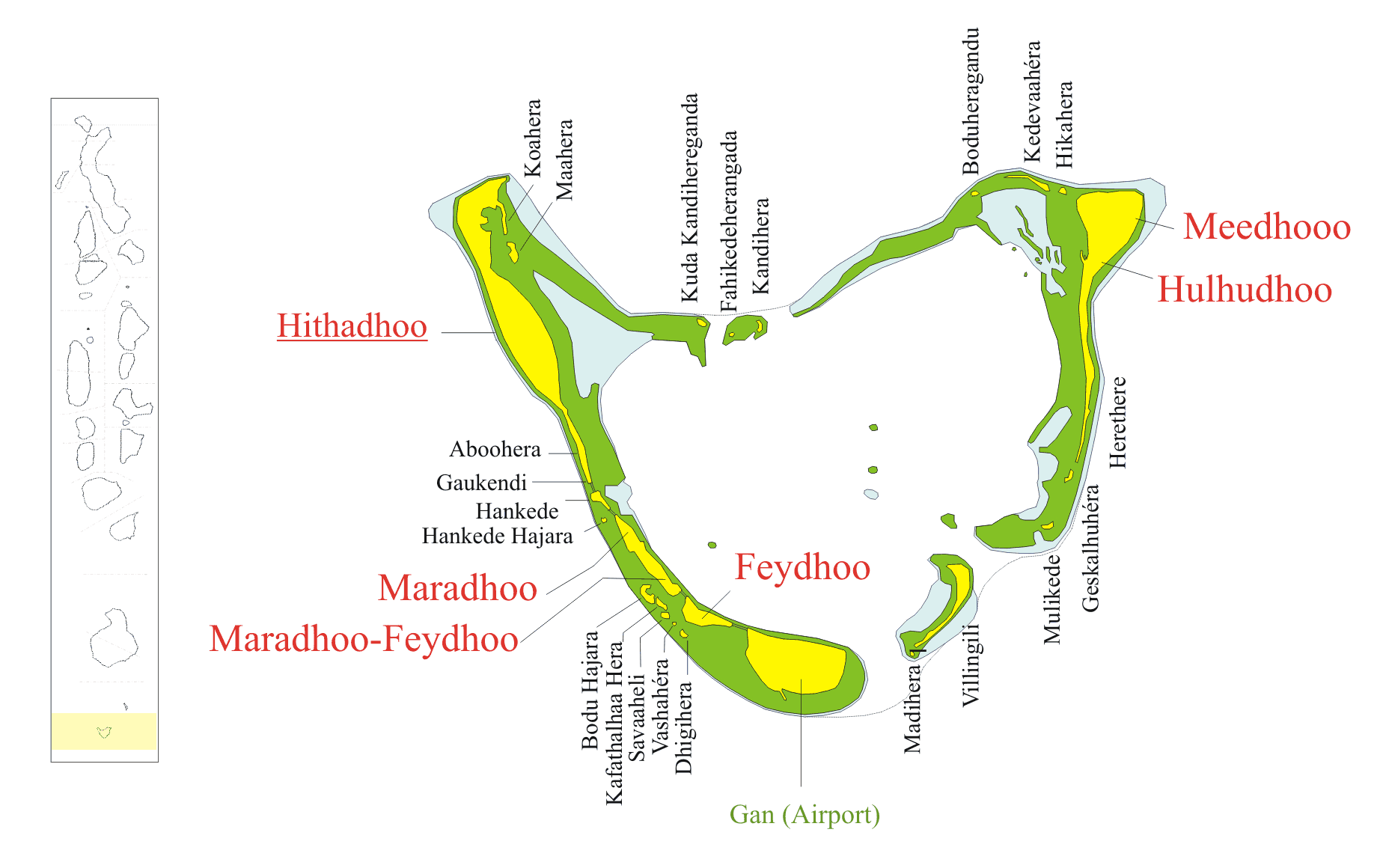
- Location in Addu Atoll Feydhoo (Maldives)
- Coordinates: 00°40′57″S 73°08′07″E
- Country: Maldives
- Geographic atoll: Addu Atoll
- Administrative atoll: Seenu Atoll
- Distance to Malé: 538.76 km (334.77 mi)

Government
  - Island Chief: Hassan Latheef

Area
  - Total: 1.22 km^{2} (0.47 sq mi)

Population (2024)
  - Total: 5,810
  - Density: 4,760/km^{2} (12,300/sq mi)
- Time zone: UTC+05:00 (MST)

Feydhoo (Dhivehi: ފޭދޫ) is one of the inhabited islands of the Addu Atoll (formerly known as Seenu Atoll).

The people of Feydhoo are former residents of Gan. Gan was a very fertile island with its coconut palms, breadfruit trees, yam, binbi and numerous other types of trees flourishing. Even during the Second World War, the people of Gan were economically self-sufficient. However, in 1956/1957 they had to leave their livelihood they had been enjoying for so long, forever because the British Royal Air Force leased the island to build RAF Gan, a military base on the island. All the residents were moved to the next island west of Gan, Feydhoo, a less fertile and much smaller island whose own residents were moved to the eastern side of Maradhoo.

== Geography ==
It is the southernmost inhabited island of Maldives. The island is 538.76 km (335 mi; 291 nmi) south of the country's capital, Malé.

== Demography ==
Historical population
Year	Pop.	±%
2014	3,193	—
2022	4,289	+34.3%
2024	5,810	+35.5%
2014-2022-2024: Census populations Source:
