= Jameel Usman =

Maldivian politician

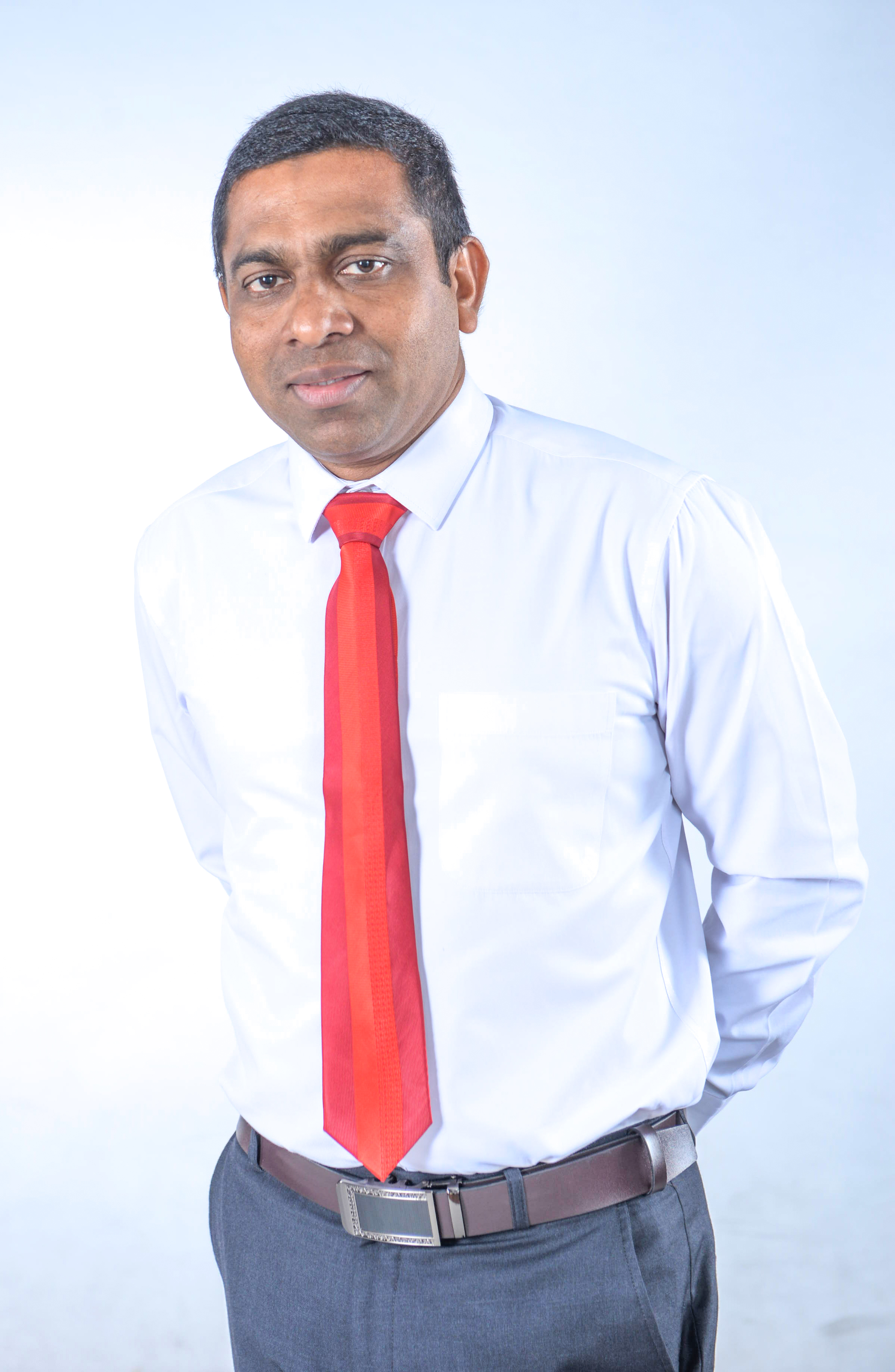
- Usman in 2019

Senator of the People's National Congress
- In office May 2014 – 2025

Member of the People's Majlis
- In office 28 May 2014 – 28 May 2019
- Succeeded by: Ahmed Saeed
- Constituency: Gemanafushi
- Preceded by: IIham Mohamed

Personal details
- Born: Kanduhulhudhoo, Gaafu Alifu Atoll, Maldives
- Party: People's National Congress; Progressive Party of Maldives (until 2025)
- Education: University of Birmingham; University of Bedfordshire (MBA)

Jameel Usman is a Maldivian politician and management expert who served as a Member of the People's Majlis, representing Gemanafushi constituency in Maldives. He served as a senator of the Progressive Party of Maldives.

== Early life and career ==
Jameel Usman was born in Gaafu Alifu Atoll, Kanduhulhudhoo. He received his primary education at Kanduhulhudhoo, Madrassa and Gaafu Dhaalu Atoll Madrassa, Gadhdhoo. He completed his secondary education from Ahmadhiyya International School, Maldives. Thereafter, he attended the University of Birmingham where received a bachelor's degree in Hospitality and Tourism Management. He also attended the University of Bedfordshire where he graduated with a master's degree in Business Administration.

Usman started his career working in the tourism, airlines, law enforcement and healthcare. He served as a Special Investigation officer at Maldives Police Service from 1996 -1998, and as Head Office Operations Manager, at Champa & Crown Resorts (CCR) from 1998-2009. He had also served as head of Supply Chain Management at Trans Maldivian Airways from 2009 to 2013. He also served as head of special projects operations at Tree Top Hospital under the same management of Champa and Crown Group, Maldives. He was the country coordinator and ambassador of the Global Youth Parliament. He had served as national public relations commissioner and deputy chief commissioner (DCC) of The Scout Association of Maldives from 2013 to 2018. Jameel Usman is a member of the Board of Directors for the Maldives Airports Company Limited (MACL), the state-owned enterprise responsible for managing Velana International Airport and other airports in the Maldives. He was appointed to this position on November 23, 2025.

He has participated in various international events including the annual conference of the Conservatives.

=== Political career ===
He served as a Member of the Parliament of People's Majlis Maldives, Gemanafushi Constituency from 2014 to 2019. He served as a Majority Chief whip, parliamentary group under the Progressive Party of Maldives from 2014 to 2019, and Senator of Progressive Coalition since 2014. In addition, he has sat on various committees in the parliament including; Parliamentary National Budget committee, National Security Services committee, Committee on Privileges, Government Oversight committee, Social Affairs committee, Committee on Independent Institutions, Public Accounts committee and National Economic Affairs committee and Majority chief whip Parliamentary Group (PG). He also played an important role as PR and marketing head for the 2023 Maldives presidential election Dr. Mohamed Muizzu.

== Parliamentary works ==
The parliament bill sponsored by Jameel and major works include the Public Accounts Act, Maldives Banking Act, Health Services Bill, Health Professional Bill, public schools, Government-aided Schools and Government Services Act, Child Protection Act, Medical Devices Bill, Maldives Export Import Act, jail and parole Act, bill on amendment to the drug Act, bill on amendment to the political parties Act, disaster management bill, bill on amendment to police Act and bill on amendment to the Partnership Act. He has also selected a committee to review the bill on defamation and freedom of expression, a committee on a paper submitted by the government on terrorism and fundamentalism and a committee to review the tourism boycott bill.

=== Constituency Projects ===
While serving as an MP under the President Yameen Abdul Gayoom administration he completed several major constituency projects in the Gemanafushi constituency which include the development of Maavarulu Airport, Gemanafushi harbor, Kanduhulhudhoo harbor, Dhevvadhoo harbor, Kondey harbor, installation of ice plants in Gemanafushi and Dhevvadhoo, water & sewerage project in Gemanafushi, mosque projects in Dhevvadhoo and Kanduhulhudhoo, futsal grounds in Dhevvadhoo, Kanduhulhudhoo, and Gemanafushi, and a health center project in Kanduhulhudhoo, along with the Council office project in Kondey.

== Awards and recognition ==
He has been recognised by the Korean Scout Association.

== Philanthropy ==
In 2013, Usman founded the Jameel foundation to help youth development programs in Maldives. He is also a member of the Global Goodwill Ambassadors Foundation.
