= 2026–27 Dhivehi Premier League =

Dhivehi Premier League
- Season: 2026–27
- Dates: 10 September 2026 – 31 March 2027
- Matches: 29
- Goals: 96 (3.31 per match)
- Top goalscorer: (Maldives) Ahmed Rizuvan (Victory Sports Club) (7 goals)
- Biggest home win: New Radiant SC 7–1 Club Eagles (24 October 2026)
- Biggest away win: Gadhdhoo RC 2–4 TC Sports Club (16 September 2026)
- Highest scoring: Victory SC 4–3 Dhidhdhoo Sports (16 September 2026)
- Longest winning run: 3 – Victory SC
- Longest unbeaten run: 6 – Victory SC
- Longest winless run: 6 – Gadhdhoo RC
- Longest losing run: 6 – Gadhdhoo RC
- Highest attendance: 1,300 Dhidhdhoo Sports 2–2 New Radiant S.C.
- Total attendance: 5,159
- Average attendance: 177

The 2026–27 Dhivehi Premier League will be the tenth season of the Premier League, the top Maldivian professional league for association football clubs since its establishment in 2015.

== Teams ==
A total of 10 teams will be contesting in the league, including 7 sides from the 2025–26 Dhivehi Premier League season and three promoted from the 2025–26 Maldives Regional Leagues; Dhidhdhoo Sports Gadhdhoo Recreation Club and Biss Buru Sports Club. This will be the first season in Maldivian top flight history to implement a home-and-away format.

=== Changes from the previous season ===
Promoted to the Premier League

- Dhidhdhoo Sports
- Gadhdhoo Recreation Club
- Biss Buru Sports Club

Relegated to Regional Leagues

- Club Green Streets
- Club Valencia
- United Victory

Locations of the 2026–27 Dhivehi Premier League teams

=== Teams and their divisions ===
Note: Table lists clubs in alphabetical order.

Team	Location	Stadium	Capacity
Biss Buru Sports Club	Maafannu, Malé	National Football Stadium	4,000
Buru Sports Club	Machchangolhi, Malé	National Football Stadium	4,000
Club Eagles	Maafannu, Malé	National Football Stadium	4,000
Dhidhdhoo Sports	HA. Dhidhdhoo	Dhidhdhoo Football Stadium	1,000
Gadhdhoo Recreation Club	GDh. Gadhdhoo	Gadhdhoo Football Stadium	1,000
Maziya	West Maafannu, Malé	National Football Stadium	4,000
New Radiant	Henveiru, Malé	National Football Stadium	4,000
Odi Sports Club	Galolhu, Malé	National Football Stadium	4,000
TC Sports Club	Henveiru, Malé	National Football Stadium	4,000
Victory Sports Club	Galolhu, Malé	National Football Stadium	4,000

=== Personnel and kits ===
Team	Head coach	Captain	Kit manufacturer	Main sponsor	Other sponsors
Biss Buru Sports Club	(Maldives) Ahmed Nashid	(Maldives) Mohamed Farish Hassan	Island Apparels	None	None
Buru Sports Club	(Spain) Cristian Rodriguez Diaz	(Maldives) Ali Hamdhaan	In-House	None	None
Club Eagles	(Maldives) Abdulla Haneef	(Maldives) Abdulla Sameeh Moosa	Aspire Sports	None	None
Dhidhdhoo Sports	(Maldives) Moosa Ibrahim	(Maldives) Adam Naseem	YN Sports	Aahiyaa Kuri	None
Gadhdhoo Recreation Club		(Maldives) Ahmed Rifshaan	In-House	None	None
Maziya	(Czech Republic) Tomáš Trucha	(Maldives) Ali Samooh	Island Apparels	Ooredoo Maldives	None
New Radiant	(Spain) Fran Caínzos	(Maldives) Mohamed Irufaan	Kappi	Damietta	List: Back: Mendhuru TV Brine Rooftop Jeelu Online; Sleeves: Harins
Odi Sports Club	(Argentina) Luciano Theiler	(Maldives) Mohamed Rasheed	Obion	WellCo Maldives	List: Back: Obion Vaguthu.mv The Norman
TC Sports Club	(Maldives) Mohamed Athif	(Maldives) Abdul Wahid Ibrahim	Kappi	None	None
Victory Sports Club	(Maldives) Mohamed Siyaz	(Maldives) Hamza Mohamed	Jozti	Singer	List: Back: Nextyle

=== Coaching changes ===
Team	Outgoing manager	Manner of departure	Date of vacancy	Position in the table	Incoming manager	Date of appointment
Buru Sports Club	(Maldives) Mohamed Nizam	End of Contract	19 April 2026	Pre-season	(Spain) Cristian Rodriguez Diaz	18 July 2026
Maziya	(Spain) Luisma Hernández	End of Contract	12 March 2026	Pre-season	(Czech Republic) Tomáš Trucha	3 August 2026
New Radiant	(Maldives) Ali Suzain	Became Technical Director	1 March 2026	Pre-season	(Spain) Fran Caínzos	1 March 2026
Odi Sports Club	(Spain) Andrés García	End of Contract	8 June 2026	Pre-season	(Portugal) Rui Gregório	8 August 2026
Victory Sports Club	(Slovakia) Gergely Geri	End of Contract	28 February 2026	Pre-season	(Maldives) Mohamed Siyaz	28 February 2026

==== During the season ====
Team	Outgoing manager	Manner of departure	Date of vacancy	Position in the table	Incoming manager	Date of appointment
Odi Sports Club	(Portugal) Rui Gregório	Sacked	18 September 2026	4th	(Argentina) Luciano Theiler	27 September 2026
Gadhdhoo Recreation Club	(Maldives) Mohamed Nazeeh	Sacked	20 October 2026	10th	-	-

== Foreign players ==
- Player's name in **bold** indicates the player was registered during the mid-season transfer window

Club	Player 1	Player 2	Player 3	Player 4	Former Players (Note: Foreign players who left their clubs or were de-registered from playing squad due to medical issues or other matters.)
Biss Buru Sports Club	(Nigeria) Aliu Owolabi Fatai	(Nigeria) Aremu Timothy Oluwaseun	(Nigeria) Barnabas Friday Akanmidu	(Ghana) Peter Sarkodie	
Buru Sports Club	(Spain) Albert Freixa Sabater	(Argentina) Juan Lescano	(Egypt) Khalil Gamal	(Colombia) Harold Yoshou	
Club Eagles	(Pakistan) Saqib Hanif	(Egypt) Amir Shoeib Elsadek	(Liberia) Van-Dave Harmon	(Montenegro) Marko Ivanovic	
Dhidhdhoo Sports	(Cameroon) Kavou Kotadai	(Cameroon) Chia Felix Gwain	(Ghana) Yusif Afful	(Ghana) Gideon Tetteh	
Gadhdhoo Recreation Club	(Serbia) Bojan Vukmirovic	(Nigeria) Emmanuel Makinde	(Serbia) Uros Jemovic	(Cameroon) Donalio Melachio Douanla	
Maziya	(Serbia) Nemanja Zdaravkovic	(Serbia) Nikola Vujicic	(Nigeria) Benjamin Kuku	(Benin) Codjo Gomez	
New Radiant	(Brazil) Guilherme Silva	(Spain) Matías Hernández	(Brazil) Dorielton Gomes Nascimento	(Liberia) Abdulai Bility	(Liberia) Albert Kayee Swen
Odi Sports Club	(Sierra Leone) Marvin Lebbie	(Brazil) Hudson Jesus	(Serbia) Tomislav Todorović	(Brazil) Lucas da Costa de Lima	
TC Sports Club	(Nigeria) Daniel Emmanuel Eybio	(Egypt) Mahmoud Ashraf	(Brazil) Magson Dourado	(Cameroon) Cyrille Dissake	
Victory Sports Club	(Uzbekistan) Shohruhbek Kholmatov	(Uzbekistan) Furkaton Khasanboev	(Nigeria) Alhaji Gero	(Uzbekistan) Mirjalol Kasimov	

== League table ==
Pos	Team	Pld	W	D	L	GF	GA	GD	Pts	Qualification or relegation
1	Victory	7	6	1	0	20	7	+13	19	Qualification for the AFC Challenge League play-offs and 2027 President's Cup
2	Maziya	6	4	1	1	13	6	+7	13	2027 President's Cup
3	New Radiant	6	3	2	1	17	9	+8	11	2027 President's Cup
4	Odi Sports	7	3	2	2	13	7	+6	11	2027 President's Cup
5	Eagles	6	3	2	1	11	10	+1	11	2027 President's Cup play-offs
6	Biss Buru Sports	5	2	0	3	5	10	−5	6	2027 President's Cup play-offs
7	TC Sports	6	2	0	4	7	16	−9	6	Qualification for the relegation play-offs and 2027 President's Cup play-offs
8	Dhidhdhoo Sports	6	1	2	3	8	10	−2	5	Qualification for the relegation play-offs and 2027 President's Cup play-offs
9	Buru Sports	5	1	0	4	4	9	−5	3	Relegation to 2027 Maldives Regional Leagues
10	Gadhdhoo Recreation	6	0	0	6	2	16	−14	0	Relegation to 2027 Maldives Regional Leagues

Updated to match(es) played on TBA. Source: Football Association of Maldives
Rules for classification: 1) Points; 2) Head-to-head points; 3) Head-to-head goal difference; 4) Head-to-head goals scored; 5) Goal difference; 6) Goals scored.

== Results ==
=== First round ===
==== Week 1 ====
10 September 2026 Match 1	Maziya	1–0	Odi Sports	National Football Stadium, Malé
21:00	Kuku 12' (pen.)	Report	Abdulla Junaid (red card) 90+3'	Attendance: 520; Referee: Javiz Mohamed

11 September 2026	Victory	5–1	TC Sports Club	National Football Stadium, Malé
21:00	Kasimov 3' (pen.); Ahmed Hassan 65'; Rizuvan 70', 85' (pen.); Gero 87'	Report	Maayiz 7'	Referee: Hussain Zaheer

12 September 2026	Gadhdhoo RC	0–2	New Radiant	Gadhdhoo Football Stadium, Gadhdhoo
15:30		Report	Dorielton 7', 45'	Attendance: 437; Referee: Sinan Hussain
Note: Fixture was initially scheduled for 11 September at 16:00, but was moved due to extreme weather conditions.

12 September 2026	Club Eagles	3–1	Biss Buru	National Football Stadium, Malé
16:00	Amir Shoeib 18'; Zain Zafar 36'; Easa 78' (pen.)	Report	Zidhan 53'	Referee: Naseer Afsheen

12 September 2026	Buru	0–1	Dhidhdhoo	National Football Stadium, Malé
21:00	Shamveel Mohamed (red card) 82'	Report	Tetteh 23'	Referee: Mohamed Ismail

==== Week 2 ====
16 September 2026	Gadhdhoo RC	2–4	TC Sports Club	Gadhdhoo Football Stadium, Gadhdhoo
15:30	Jemovic 44' (pen.); Emmanuel 85'	Report	Mahmoud Ashraf 8', 12'; Magson Dourado 21' (pen.); Maayiz 90+5'	Attendance: 223; Referee: Rauf Raeef

16 September 2026	Victory	4–3	Dhidhdhoo	National Football Stadium, Malé
16:00	Rizuvan 30', 41'; Naiz Hassan 31'; Naseem 85' (o.g.)	Report	Tetteh 54' (pen.), 83'; Zimyaan 63'	Referee: Nadheem Ali

17 September 2026	Odi Sports	4–1	Buru	National Football Stadium, Malé
16:00	Muzdhan 8'; Sakhaau 75'; Ahzam 90'; Ibrahim Waheed 90+5'	Report	Lescano 45+4'	Referee: Sinan Hussain

17 September 2026	Maziya	2–3	New Radiant	National Football Stadium, Malé
21:00	Aisam 16', 62'; Hassan Shifaz (red card) 78'	Report	Raif 40'; Fasir 65'; Dorielton 90+10'; Ibrahim Maisaan (red card) 78'	Attendance: 475; Referee: Hussain Zaheer

20 September 2026	Gadhdhoo RC	0–2	Club Eagles	Gadhdhoo Football Stadium, Gadhdhoo
15:30		Report	Easa 68'; Jailam 90+2'	Attendance: 467; Referee: Sinan Hussain

20 September 2026	Biss Buru	1–0	Dhidhdhoo	National Football Stadium, Malé
21:00	Barnabas 67'	Report	Nooh (red card) 45+1'	Referee: Fazeel Adam

==== Week 3 ====
9 October 2026	Buru	1–2	Biss Buru	National Football Stadium, Malé
16:00	Yaameen 30'	Report	Aliu Fatai 80'; Majdhaan 90+7'; Uloof Ahmed (red card) 75'	Attendance: 200; Referee: Sinan Hussain

9 October 2026	Odi Sports	4–0	Gadhdhoo RC	National Football Stadium, Malé
21:00	Hudson Dias 10'; Ahzam 16'; Ibrahim Waheed Hassan 36'; Todorović 74'	Report	Jemovic Uros (red card) 26'	Attendance: 100; Referee: Mohamed Ismail

10 October 2026	Maziya	2–2	Victory	National Football Stadium, Malé
16:00	Looth 56'; Aiham 82'	Report	Furkatjon 28'; Gero 86'	Referee: Naseer Afsheen

10 October 2026	Dhidhdhoo	2–2	New Radiant	Dhidhdhoo Football Stadium, Dhidhdhoo
15:45	Ufaal 10'; Tetteh 13'	Report	Ashfaq 34'; Bility 90+10'	Attendance: 1,300; Referee: Javiz Mohamed

11 October 2026	Club Eagles	3–0	TC Sports Club	National Football Stadium, Malé
21:00	Van-Dave 44', 86'; Ivanovic 80'	Report		Referee: Nadheem Ali

==== Week 4 ====
13 October 2026	Buru	2–0	Gadhdhoo RC	National Football Stadium, Malé
16:00	Lescano 50'; Usamaa 77'	Report		Attendance: 205; Referee: Hussain Zaheer

14 October 2026	Victory	3–0	Biss Buru	National Football Stadium, Malé
16:00	Rizuvan 27'; Shokhrukhbek Kholmatov 48'; Gero 55'	Report		Attendance: 357; Referee: Rauf Raeef

15 October 2026	Maziya	3–0	TC Sports Club	National Football Stadium, Malé
16:00	Ibrahim Mahudhee 33'; Zdaravkovic 69'; Kuku 78'	Report		Referee: Nadheem Ali

15 October 2026	Odi Sports	2–2	New Radiant	National Football Stadium, Malé
21:00	Ahzam 46'; Muzdhan 57'	Report	Dorielton 47'; Amdhan 88'	Attendance: 350; Referee: Naseer Afsheen

16 October 2026	Dhidhdhoo	2–2	Club Eagles	Dhidhdhoo Football Stadium, Dhidhdhoo
16:00	Chia Felix 53' (pen.); Tetteh 74'; Adam Shiyaan (red card) 90+2'	Report	Jailam 42'; Van-Dave 89'; Ali Ishfaaq (red card) 65'	Attendance: 150; Referee: Mohamed Ismail

==== Week 5 ====
18 October 2026	Victory	2–0	Gadhdhoo RC	National Football Stadium, Malé
21:00	Ahmed 18'; Maish 40'	Report		Attendance: 200; Referee: Abdul Baree Nasrulla

20 October 2026	Dhidhdhoo	0–1	TC Sports Club	Dhidhdhoo Football Stadium, Dhidhdhoo
16:00		Report	Magson 45+2'	Referee: Naseer Afsheen

20 October 2026	Maziya	3–1	Biss Buru	National Football Stadium, Malé
21:00	Ali Shaihan Naseem 28' (o.g.); Looth 51'; Gomez 58'	Report	Ahnaf Mohamed 35'	Referee: Mohamed Ismail

21 October 2026	Odi Sports	0–0	Club Eagles	National Football Stadium, Malé
16:00		Report		Attendance: 175; Referee: Rauf Raeef

21 October 2026	New Radiant	–	Buru	National Football Stadium, Malé
21:00
Note: Match Cancelled due to Heavy Rain

==== Week 6 ====
24 October 2026	New Radiant	7–1	Club Eagles	National Football Stadium, Malé
16:00	Dorielton 8', 40'; Fasir 21', 67'; Maisaan 51'; Bility 77'; Raif 88'	Report	Amir Shoeib 79'

24 October 2026	Odi Sports	0–2	Victory	National Football Stadium, Malé
21:00		Report	Rizuvan 20', 31'

25 October 2026	TC Sports Club	1–2	Biss Buru	National Football Stadium, Malé
16:00	Eenaaz 65'	Report	Atheeg 11'; Zidhan 15'

25 October 2026	Maziya	2–0	Buru	National Football Stadium, Malé
21:00	Kuku 62', 79'	Report

==== Week 7 ====
22 November 2026	Odi Sports	3–1	TC Sports Club	National Football Stadium, Malé
16:00	Hudson 40', 67'; Ibrahim Waheed 45+5'	Report	Dhaanish 33'

22 November 2026	New Radiant	1–2	Victory	National Football Stadium, Malé
21:00	Naim 31'; Naim (red card) 45+5'	Report	Gero 19', 79'; Kasimov (red card) 45+5'

23 November 2026	Maziya	–	Dhidhdhoo	National Football Stadium, Malé
16:00

23 November 2026	Gadhdhoo RC	–	Biss Buru	Gadhdhoo Football Stadium, Gadhdhoo
16:00

24 November 2026	Buru	–	Club Eagles	National Football Stadium, Malé
21:00

==== Week 8 ====
27 November 2026	Odi Sports	–	Dhidhdhoo	National Football Stadium, Malé
16:00

28 November 2026	New Radiant	–	Biss Buru	National Football Stadium, Malé
16:00

28 November 2026	Buru	–	TC Sports Club	National Football Stadium, Malé
21:00

29 November 2026	Gadhdhoo RC	–	Maziya	Gadhdhoo Football Stadium, Gadhdhoo
16:00

29 November 2026	Club Eagles	–	Victory	National Football Stadium, Malé
21:00

==== Week 9 ====
4 December 2026	Gadhdhoo RC	–	Dhidhdhoo	Gadhdhoo Football Stadium, Gadhdhoo
16:00

4 December 2026	Odi Sports	–	Biss Buru	National Football Stadium, Malé
21:00

5 December 2026	New Radiant	–	TC Sports Club	National Football Stadium, Malé
16:00

5 December 2026	Maziya	–	Club Eagles	National Football Stadium, Malé
16:00

6 December 2026	Buru	–	Victory	National Football Stadium, Malé
16:00

== Season statistics ==
As of 16 October 2026

=== Top scorers ===
Rank	Player	Club	Goals
1	(Maldives) Ahmed Rizuvan	Victory	7
2	(Brazil) Dorielton Gomes	New Radiant	6
3	(Ghana) Gideon Tetteh	Dhidhdhoo	5
3	(Nigeria) Alhaji Gero	Victory	5
4	(Nigeria) Benjamin Kuku	Maziya	4
5	(Liberia) Van-Dave Harmon	Eagles	3
5	(Maldives) Ahzam Rasheed	Odi Sports	3
6	(Maldives) Ismail Easa	Eagles	2
6	(Maldives) Ibrahim Waheed	Odi Sports	2
6	(Maldives) Mohamed Jailam	Eagles	2

=== Clean sheets ===
Rank	Player	Club	Clean sheets
1	(Maldives) Hussain Shareef	Maziya	3
2	(Pakistan) Saqib Hanif	Eagles	2
2	(Maldives) Mohamed Shafeeu	Victory SC	2
3	(Maldives) Mohamed Ashwaan	Odi Sports	1
