= Kooddoo =

- Inhabited island
- Location in Maldives
- Coordinates: 00°44′00″N 73°26′00″E
- Country: Maldives
- Geographic atoll: Huvadhu Atoll
- Administrative atoll: Gaafu Alif Atoll
- Distance to Malé: 383 km (238 mi)

Government
  - Council: Saud Hussain

Area
  - Total: 0.82 km^{2} (0.32 sq mi)

Dimensions
  - Length: 1.560 km (0.969 mi)
  - Width: 0.520 km (0.323 mi)

Population (Nov 2013)
  - Total: 150
  - Density: 180/km^{2} (470/sq mi)
- Time zone: UTC+05:00 (MST)

Kooddoo or Koodoo (Dhivehi: ކޫއްޑޫ) is one of the inhabited islands of the Maldives, located on the northeastern rim of Huvadhu Atoll. It is a part of the administrative division of Gaafu Alif Atoll, which was created out of Huvadhu Atoll on February 8, 1962.

The island is situated between the much-more populated islands of Villingili and Maamendhoo. It holds a domestic airport, Kooddoo Airport, which offers flights to and from Velana International Airport, consequently serving as the main link between Gaafu Alif Atoll and the rest of the country. There are also a canning factory, an icing factory, some restaurants, and a gas station.

In 2017, the island welcomed a 4-star hotel, Mercure Maldives Kooddoo Resort. Operated by Accor, it is billed as the country's only resort with direct access to an airport, excising the need for a speedboat or seaplane transfer.
