= Ahmed Aiham (footballer, born 1998) =

Maldivian footballer

Aihu
- Aihu with Odi in 2025

Personal information
- Full name: Ahmed Aiham
- Date of birth: 23 March 1998 (age 28)
- Place of birth: R. Inguraidhoo, Maldives
- Position: Right-back

Team information
- Current team: Odi SC
- Number: 2

Youth career
- 2019: Club Eydhafushi

Senior career*
Years	Team	Apps	(Gls)
2016	Mas Odi		
2017–2018	TC Sports		
2020	JJ Sports	5	(1)
2020–2024	Super United		
2025–	Odi SC	18	(3)

International career^{‡}
2025–	Maldives	11	(0)
- * Club domestic league appearances and goals as of 6 February 2026 ‡ National team caps and goals as of 1 October 2026

Ahmed Aiham (Dhivehi: އަޙްމަދު އައިހަމް; born 23 March 1998) nicknamed Aihu, is a Maldivian footballer who plays as a right-back for Odi Sports Club and Maldives national team.

== Club career ==
=== Early life and youth career ===
Aiham was born in R. Inguraidhoo, Maldives. He began his football career playing for Mas Odi Sports Club in the 2016 Third Division Football Tournament, where his performances attracted the attention of TC Sports Club head coach Mohamed Nizam.

After leaving TC Sports Club during mid 2018, he played in 2019 FAM Youth Championship with Club Eydhafushi U21s.

=== TC Sports Club ===
Aiham joined TC Sports Club in 2017 and made his first-team debut at the 2017 Sheikh Kamal International Club Cup, which TC went on to win. He also featured in the 2018 AFC Cup qualifying matches, making his continental debut as a substitute against Saif Sporting Club in a 3–1 victory.

=== JJ Sports Club ===
Aiham played for JJ Sports Club in the Maldivian Second Division Football Tournament during 2020. He scored his only goal for the club during the 7–3 win against Mahibadhoo on 8 February 2020.

=== Super United Sports ===
In October 2020, Aiham signed with the newly promoted Super United Sports. Over three seasons in Dhivehi Premier League, he became a key defensive figure, helping them achieve a third-place finish in 2023.

=== Odi Sports Club ===
In 18 December 2024, Aiham returned to his former side, now renamed Odi Sports Club.

He made his Dhivehi Premier League debut for Odi on 20 September 2025 against United Victory where they went on to win 4–0. On 31 October 2025, he scored his first goal for the club which was a long-range strike from outside the box in a 3–0 win against Club Green Streets.

== International career ==
Aiham received his first call-up to the Maldives national team in May 2025 by head coach Ali Suzain for the 2027 AFC Asian Cup qualifiers against Timor-Leste.

He made his senior debut on 5 June 2025, starting in a friendly against Singapore, which ended in a 3–1 defeat. He was initially listed as a substitute for the match but a warm-up injury to Haisham Hassan gave him the chance to start the match. Aiham also started the qualifying match against Timor-Leste on 10 June 2025.

Later that year, under new head coach Mohamed Siyaz, he was deployed as a defensive midfielder in friendlies against Sri Lanka.

== Personal life ==
On 22 February 2022, Aiham married Sama Mujuthaba. The couple welcomed their first child, a son named Umut Ahmed Aiham, on 25 July 2023.

== Honours ==
Odi Sports Club

- President's Cup: 2026
