= Hassan Saajin =

Maldivian fisherman, activist

- Born: 25 February 1998 (age 28); Gemanafushi, Gaafu Alifu Atoll, Maldives
- Other name: Zuvaan Masveriya
- Occupations: fisherman, activist
- Awards: "Youth Leader of the Year" at the Professional and Career Women Awards 2022
- Website: zuvaanmasveriya.com

Hassan Saajin (born 25 February 1998) is a Maldivian fisherman and activist, also known as Zuvaan Masveriya ("young fisherman"). In 2020, he was featured as the brand ambassador for Ooredoo Maldives, appearing in publicity alongside global ambassador Lionel Messi. Saajin campaigns on issues facing the fishing community in the Maldives.

== Work ==
Saajin registered the foundation Dhivehi Masverin (Maldives Fishermen), which has operated since 2018. One area of Saajin's work is encouraging youth to adopt sustainable fishing practices. Hassan was a co-creator of the campaign #AnhenehVeema (or “Because She’s a Woman”) to raise awareness on the types of hate that women experience online. In 2021 he delivered petition about the effects of climate change on fishermen to the 16th UN Climate Change Conference of Youth (COY16).

== Recognition ==
President Ibrahim Mohamed Solih praised his work on behalf of fishermen in the Maldives. Saajin received the Youth Leader of the Year award at the Professional and Career Women Awards 2022. In 2023, the Haa Alif Atoll Council presented a plaque to the Saajin in recognition of his work promoting the fisheries and cultural heritage of the area.
