= Ahnaf Rasheed =

Maldivian footballer

Ahukko
Personal information
- Full name: Ahnaf Rasheed
- Date of birth: 23 November 2001 (age 24)
- Place of birth: GA. Dhevvadhoo, Maldives
- Position: Centre-back

Team information
- Current team: New Radiant
- Number: 20

Youth career
- 2019: Da Grande

Senior career*
Years	Team	Apps	(Gls)
2019–2020	Da Grande	1	(0)
2020–2021	Valencia	0	(0)
2020	Maldives U19	4	(0)
2022–2025	Super United	18	(2)
2025–	New Radiant	0	(0)

International career^{‡}
2019	Maldives U18	4	(0)
2019	Maldives U19	3	(0)
2021	Maldives U23	3	(0)
2022–	Maldives	3	(0)
- * Club domestic league appearances and goals as of 26 August 2025 ‡ National team caps and goals as of 16 November 2024

Ahnaf Rasheed (Dhivehi: އަޙްނަފް ރަޝީދު; born 23 November 2001) nicknamed Ahukko, is a Maldivian footballer who plays as a centre-back for New Radiant and Maldives national team.

== Club career ==
Ahnaf began his senior career in 2019 with Da Grande Sports Club, where he was named vice-captain of the under 21 side in the FAM Youth Championship. In 2020, he signed for Club Valencia, and during the same season played in the Maldives Second Division with the national under 19 team as the captain.

On 15 November 2021, Ahnaf joined Super United Sports. The following year he suffered an anterior cruciate ligament injury and underwent surgery in November 2022.

Ahnaf scored his first Premier League goal on 9 May 2023, in Super United Sport's 2023 league opener, in the 5–1 win against Club Green Streets. He also scored in their last game of the league, a 5–0 win against TC Sports Club, helping Super United Sports to a third-place finish while serving as the team’s vice-captain.

On 26 August 2025, he signed a one-year contract with New Radiant, one of the most successful clubs in Maldivian football.

== International career ==
Ahnaf represented the Maldives at youth levels, and most notably he won bronze medal with Maldives at 2019 SAFF U18 Championship.

On 21 September 2022, coach Francesco Moriero gave him his senior team debut, starting the friendly match against Brunei, a 3–0 win at Track and Field Sports Complex in Bandar Seri Begawan. Hence, he was forced to leave the field in 17 minutes due to injury.

He was named in the Maldives squad for the 2023 SAFF Championship, though he did not make an appearance. Later that year, coach Ali Suzain featured him in the 2026 FIFA World Cup qualification – AFC first round matches against Bangladesh, starting both legs. On 16 November 2024, He was sent off in the 94th-minute of the 2–1 loss in the second leg, played at the Bashundhara Kings Arena in Dhaka.

== Futsal ==
In addition to football, Ahnaf has also competed in futsal. At the 2025 Golden Futsal Challenge, he captained Dhevvadhoo, leading them to their first ever Gaafu Alifu Atoll title, and earning the titles of Best Player and Top Scorer of the Atoll.

He was also part of Club TFT, which won the Maldives qualifier of the street style 2024 Red Bull Four 2 Score World Finals. The team advanced to the tournament's round of 16 in Leipzig, Germany.

== Personal life ==
Ahnaf was born in G.A. Dhevvadhoo. He has a younger brother, Ahmed Raahil Rasheed, who is also a footballer and plays for Odi Sports Club and the Maldives national futsal team.

== Honours ==
Maldives U18

- SAFF U18 Championship Bronze: 2019
