= Ilham Ahmed =

Ilham Ahmed may refer to:

- Îlham Ehmed (born 1963), Syrian Kurdish politician.
- Ilham Ahmed (fl. from 2009), Maldivian politician.
