= 2020–21 Premier League (disambiguation) =

The 2020–21 Premier League was a professional association football league season in England.

2020–21 Premier League may also refer to:

== Association football ==
- 2020–21 Armenian Premier League
- 2020–21 Azerbaijan Premier League
- 2020–21 Dhivehi Premier League
- 2020–21 Premier League of Belize
- 2020–21 Premier League of Bosnia and Herzegovina
- 2020–21 Egyptian Premier League
- 2020–21 Ghana Premier League
- 2020–21 Hong Kong Premier League
- 2020–21 I-League
- 2020–21 Iraqi Premier League
- 2020–21 Israeli Premier League
- 2020–21 Lebanese Premier League
- 2020–21 Maltese Premier League
- 2020–21 Russian Premier League
- 2020–21 Syrian Premier League
- 2020–21 Tanzanian Premier League
- 2020–21 Ukrainian Premier League
- 2020–21 Welsh Premier League

== Basketball ==
- 2020–21 Belarusian Premier League
- 2020–21 Israeli Basketball Premier League

== Cricket ==
- 2020–21 Bangladesh Premier League
- 2021 Indian Premier League
