= Dhidhdhoo (disambiguation) =

Dhidhdhoo is the capital of Haa Alif Atoll in the Maldives

Dhidhdhoo as a place name may refer to:

- Dhidhdhoo (Haa Alif Atoll), Maldives
- Dhidhdhoo, an uninhabited island in Lhaviyani Atoll, Maldives
