= Ilham Ahmed (politician) =

Maldivian politician

People's Majlis
- In office 2009–2014
- Succeeded by: Jameel Usman
- Constituency: Gemanafushi

People's Majlis
- Incumbent
- Assumed office 2019
- Constituency: Dhangethi

Personal details
- Party: Jumhooree Party
- Other political affiliations: Independent; Progressive Party of Maldives

Ilham Ahmed is a Maldivian politician who is the current MP for Dhangethi Constituency in the People's Majlis. He is former MP for Gemanafushi Constituency in the People's Majlis and the Former President of Football Association of Maldives. Ilham was one of the Vice Presidents of Jumhooree Party and was formerly one of the two Vice Presidents of Progressive Party of Maldives elected by the first congress of the party. A native of Gemanafushi in Huvadhu Atoll, Ilham's family roots can be traced back to Fuvahmulah and Addu Atoll as well. Due to the increased oppression of the Maldivian government, Ilham resigned from PPM on 9 July 2017 becoming an Independent member.
