= Dhidhdhoo Sports =

- Full name: Dhidhdhoo Sports
- Nickname: The Boanthashians
- Founded: 9 September 2025; 13 months ago (as Association for Dhidhdhoo Sports)
- Ground: Dhidhdhoo Football Ground
- Capacity: 1,000
- Coordinates: 6.881389°N 73.115556°E
- President: Moosa Naseer
- Head coach: Moosa Ibrahim (interim)
- League: Dhivehi Premier League
- 2025–26: 1st of 4 (promoted via play-offs)
Home colours	Away colours

Dhidhdhoo Sports (Dhivehi: ދިއްދޫ ސްޕޯޓްސް), also known as Association for Dhidhdhoo Sports, is a Maldivian football club based in Dhidhdhoo, Haa Alif Atoll. Founded on 9 September 2025, the club was established to represent the island of Dhidhdhoo in the Maldives' newly formed national football league structure that year.

The club competes in the Dhivehi Premier League, the highest level of football in the Maldives. After winning the Haa Alif Atoll Championship and the North Regional League during its inaugural season, Dhidhdhoo Sports finished third in the 2026–27 Dhivehi Premier League qualification and secured promotion to the top division.

== History ==
=== Rise through the football pyramid ===
Dhidhdhoo Sports' inaugural 2025–26 season saw the club progress through the Maldivian football pyramid and qualify for the Dhivehi Premier League.

The club began its campaign in the Haa Alif Atoll Championship. The competition featured two teams, Dhidhdhoo Sports and Ihavandhoo, and was played over two legs. Dhidhdhoo won the first leg 3–1 and the second leg 6–0, winning the championship 9–1 on aggregate.

As the Atoll Championship champions, Dhidhdhoo advanced to the North Regional League qualifiers. The qualification competition divided participating teams into two zones, with the finalists progressing to the North Regional League. Dhidhdhoo, in Zone 1, reached the final where the match against Hanimaadhoo ended in a 3–3 draw, with Dhidhdhoo losing the subsequent penalty shoot-out 5–3. Reaching the final secured Dhidhdhoo's place in the North Regional League.

Dhidhdhoo then competed in the North Regional League during the 2025–26 season. The club finished the six-match campaign unbeaten, recording five wins and one draw, scoring 12 goals and conceding three. With 16 points, Dhidhdhoo finished first and were crowned North Regional champions.

The regional championship qualified Dhidhdhoo Sports for the 2026–27 Dhivehi Premier League qualification. Six teams competed for four places in the following season's Premier League. Dhidhdhoo began the qualification tournament with a 1–0 victory over Gadhdhoo Recreation Club, the South Region champions. They subsequently lost 3–0 to TC Sports Club before defeating Huraa Community Club, the Central Region champions, 3–1. A 2–2 draw against Club Green Streets secured Dhidhdhoo a place among the four promoted teams. In their final match, Dhidhdhoo defeated Biss Buru Sports Club, the Malé Region champions, 6–2. Dhidhdhoo finished third in the qualification tournament and secured promotion to the Dhivehi Premier League for the first time.

=== 2026–27 season ===
Dhidhdhoo Sports made its Dhivehi Premier League debut during the 2026–27 season following its promotion from the regional league system and subsequent qualification phase. The club's head coach, Moosa Ibrahim, returned to lead the team in its first Premier League campaign. Ibrahim, who is from Holhudhoo, had been involved in football in Dhidhdhoo since 2021. Following Dhidhdhoo's promotion to the Premier League, he initially stepped aside for personal reasons. He subsequently returned to serve the club's inaugural Premier League campaign. Ibrahim holds an AFC B coaching licence and is registered as an assistant coach, as the league's coaching regulations require at least an AFC A coaching licence for a permanent Premier League head coach. He is currently acting as interim head coach while the club seeks to appoint a permanent head coach.

Dhidhdhoo played its first Premier League match on 12 September 2026 against Buru Sports Club, winning 1–0. Their Ghanaian striker Gideon Tetteh scored the only goal of the match, giving the club a victory in its first appearance in the top division.

== Club identity ==
Dhidhdhoo Sports uses purple as its primary club colour, with white as a secondary colour. Purple is predominantly used on the club's home playing kit, while white has also been used on alternative kits. The club represents Dhidhdhoo and its football community in Haa Alif Atoll.

== Supporters ==
The club's fan base is officially known and stylised as "The Boathashians" (Dhivehi: ބޯތަށިއަންސް).

The nickname is derived from the Dhivehi word Boathashi (Dhivehi: ބޯތަށި), meaning "satellite dish", which is a lighthearted reference to a famous local folk legend from the early 1990s when satellite dishes were first introduced to Haa Alifu Dhidhdhoo. The suffix "-ans" was appended to stylise the term, symbolising the identity and collective spirit of the club's supporters. Once used historically as a mocking joke, the island's football community reclaimed the culture and converted the reference into a badge of pride, establishing a unique identity within Maldivian football fan culture.

== Stadium ==
Dhidhdhoo Sports plays its home matches at the Dhidhdhoo Football Ground in Dhidhdhoo, Haa Alif Atoll. The ground has a reported capacity of 1,000 spectators. For the 2026–27 season, Dhidhdhoo Sports is scheduled to host Dhivehi Premier League matches at the ground following the club's promotion to the top division.

To support the club's participation in top flight football under the new Dhivehi Premier League format, a new international standard stadium is currently under construction on the island. The foundation stone for the project was officially laid in January 2024 by President Dr. Mohamed Muizzu, with full physical works commencing later that year.

Developed in accordance with FIFA guidelines, the facility will feature modern changing rooms and international standard match infrastructure. According to the Minister of Sports, Fitness and Recreation, Abdulla Rafiu, the stadium project is progressing at a rapid pace and is scheduled for full completion in 2027.

== Honours ==
League

- Regional League (level 2)
  - Champions: 2025–26
- Regional League Qualifiers
  - Runners-up: 2025–26
- Atoll Championship (level 3)
  - Champions: 2025–26

== See also ==
- Dhivehi Premier League
- Football in the Maldives
- Haa Alif Atoll
- Dhidhdhoo
