= Hulhimendhoo =

Hulhimendhoo may refer to the following places in the Maldives:

- Hulhimendhoo (Gaafu Alif Atoll)
- Hulhimendhoo (Laamu Atoll)
