= 2020–21 Dhivehi Premier League =

Dhivehi Premier League
- Season: 2020–21
- Dates: 13 December 2020 – 2 May 2021
- Champions: Maziya
- Relegated: no relegation
- AFC Cup: Maziya; Valencia
- Matches: 56
- Goals: 140 (2.5 per match)
- Top goalscorer: (Saint Vincent and the Grenadines) Cornelius Stewart (11 goals)

The 2020–21 Dhivehi Premier League is the sixth season of the Premier League, the top Maldivian professional league for association football clubs since its establishment in 2015. Maziya are the defending champions, having won their third league title the previous season, their second in the Premier League era, having last won in 2016. The season was initially scheduled to start in June, but this was delayed until December as a consequence of the delay of the 2020 AFC Cup and 2022 FIFA World Cup qualifiers due to the outbreak of COVID-19 in the Maldives.

== Teams ==
Location football club of Dhivehi Premier League

Initially, ten teams were set to compete in the league – the top eight teams from the previous season and the two teams promoted from the Second Division. The promoted teams are Club Valencia and Super United Sports. On 22 July 2020, Football Association of Maldives announced that this season will be held with eight teams. This is due to temporarily holding off the Premier League slots for the teams promoting from the Jazeera Championship as the 2020 edition was called off due to COVID-19 pandemic in the Maldives, meaning Foakaidhoo FC and Nilandhoo Sports Club are forced to play in the 2021 Jazeera Championship even though they survived relegation.

Valencia is returning after a season's absence in the first division (three seasons in Premier League). This is the first season in the Premier League for Super United Sports. They replaced Victory Sports Club and New Radiant (both teams relegated after suspension due to financial reasons).

=== Teams and their divisions ===
Note: Table lists clubs in alphabetical order.

Team	Division	Stadium	Capacity
Eagles	Maafannu	National Football Stadium	11,850
Green Streets	Machchangolhi	National Football Stadium	11,850
Valencia	Machchangolhi	National Football Stadium	11,850
Da Grande	Maafannu	National Football Stadium	11,850
Maziya	West Maafannu	National Football Stadium	11,850
Super United	Machchangolhi	National Football Stadium	11,850
TC Sports Club	Henveiru	National Football Stadium	11,850
United Victory	Galolhu	National Football Stadium	11,850

=== Personnel ===
Note: Flags indicate national team as has been defined under FIFA eligibility rules. Players may hold more than one non-FIFA nationality.

Team	Head coach	Captain	Kit manufacturer	Shirt sponsor (chest)	Shirt sponsor (back)	Shirt sponsor (sleeve)	Short
Club Eagles	(Maldives) Mohamed Shiyaz	(Maldives) Hussain Sifaau	Jerzia				
Green Streets	(Maldives) Ali Nisthar Mohamed	(Maldives) Rilwan Waheed	Captain Maldives				
Valencia	(Maldives) Mohamed Athif	(Maldives) Ali Ashfaq	Jerzia				
Da Grande	(Maldives) Ismail Mahfooz	(Maldives) Yasfaadh Habeeb	Malhi MV				
Maziya	(Serbia) Risto Vidaković	(Maldives) Asadhulla Abdulla	SE - Sports Emporium	Ooredoo Maldives			
TC Sports	(Maldives) Mohamed Shazly	(Maldives) Mohamed Azzam					
Super United	(Maldives) Ahmed Nashid	(Maldives) Ahmed Farhan	SE - Sports Emporium	Fathaha Mall (main); Heena Mobiles	SJ Group (top); Maldives Wave (bottom)	Albion Store	LITUS
United Victory	(Maldives) Ihsan Abdul Ghanee (interim)	(Maldives) Mohamed Arif	Jerzia				

=== Coaching changes ===
Team	Outgoing Head Coach	Manner of departure	Date of vacancy	Position in table	Incoming Head Coach	Date of appointment
Maziya	(North Macedonia) Marjan Sekulovski	End of contract	2 July 2020	Pre-season	(Maldives) Mohamed Nizam	21 July 2020
Super United	(Maldives) Ibrahim Shafiu	End of contract	20 February 2020	Pre-season	(Maldives) Ahmed Nashid	13 September 2020
Valencia	(Maldives) Ilmau Hussain Ibrahim	End of contract	20 February 2020	Pre-season	(Maldives) Mohamed Athif	16 October 2020
Maziya	(Maldives) Mohamed Nizam	Resigned	27 December 2020	1st	(Maldives) Ahmed Suzayr (interim)	27 December 2020
Maziya	(Maldives) Ahmed Suzayr (interim)	Arrival of new coach	3 January 2021	2nd	(Serbia) Risto Vidaković	3 January 2021
Club Eagles	(Maldives) Mohamed Shiyaz	Mutual consent	16 January 2021	7th	Vaccent	TBA
United Victory	(Maldives) Mohamed Adam	Resigned	16 January 2021	8th	(Maldives) Ihsan Abdul Ghanee (interim)	16 January 2021

== Foreign players ==
Club	Player 1	Player 2	Player 3	Asian Player	Former Players ^{1}
Club Eagles	(Egypt) Osama Elshihy	(Egypt) **Elsayed Mahmoud**		(Lebanon) **Mohammad Taha**	(Burkina Faso) Ismaël Yanogo (Montenegro) Milan Jelovac (Yemen) Osama Anbar
Green Streets	(Egypt) Khalil Elbezawy	(Spain) Angel Carrasco Muñoz	(Egypt) Mahmoud Sayed	(Pakistan) Saqib Hanif	(Egypt) Elsayed Mahmoud
Valencia	(Spain) Jose Dominguez	(Spain) Toni Soler		(Uzbekistan) Vladislav Nuriev	
Da Grande	(Uzbekistan) Otabek Khaydarov		(Uzbekistan) Abdurasal Komilov	(Uzbekistan) Akhror Umarjonov	
Maziya	(Saint Vincent and the Grenadines) Cornelius Stewart	(Serbia) Petar Planić	(Serbia) Nikola Vujanac	(Japan) Takashi Odawara	
TC Sports	(Saint Vincent and the Grenadines) Malcolm Stewart	(Azerbaijan) Elmaddin Mammadov		(Sri Lanka) Duckson Puslas	
Super United	(Spain) Víctor Rodríguez Muñoz	(Uzbekistan) Mirzokhid Mamatkhonov	(Japan) Atsushi Yonezawa	(Japan) Eisuke Mohri	
United Victory	(Ukraine) Kyrylo Silich	(Kyrgyzstan) Anatoliy Vlasichev	(Kyrgyzstan) Marat Ajiniyazov	(Kyrgyzstan) Ruslan Amirov	

- Players name in **bold** indicates the player is registered during the mid-season transfer window.
- **^1** Foreign players who left their clubs or were de-registered from playing squad due to medical issues or other matters.

== League table ==
Pos	Team	Pld	W	D	L	GF	GA	GD	Pts	Qualification or relegation
1	Maziya (C)	14	10	4	0	34	6	+28	34	Qualification for 2022 AFC Cup group stage
2	Valencia	14	7	4	3	21	9	+12	25	Qualification for 2022 AFC Cup preliminary round 2
3	Green Streets	14	5	4	5	13	16	−3	19	
4	Eagles	14	4	5	5	15	21	−6	17	
5	Da Grande	14	4	4	6	17	25	−8	16	
6	Super United	14	3	6	5	9	18	−9	15	
7	TC Sports	14	3	4	7	11	19	−8	13	
8	United Victory	14	3	3	8	20	26	−6	12	

Source: Dhivehi Premier League
Rules for classification: 1) Points; 2) Head-to-head points; 3) Head-to-head goal difference; 4) Head-to-head goals scored; 5) Goal difference; 6) Goals scored.
(C) Champions
