= Maavarulu Airport =

Airport in Maldives

Maavarulu Airport މާވާރުލު އެއާރޕޯޓް
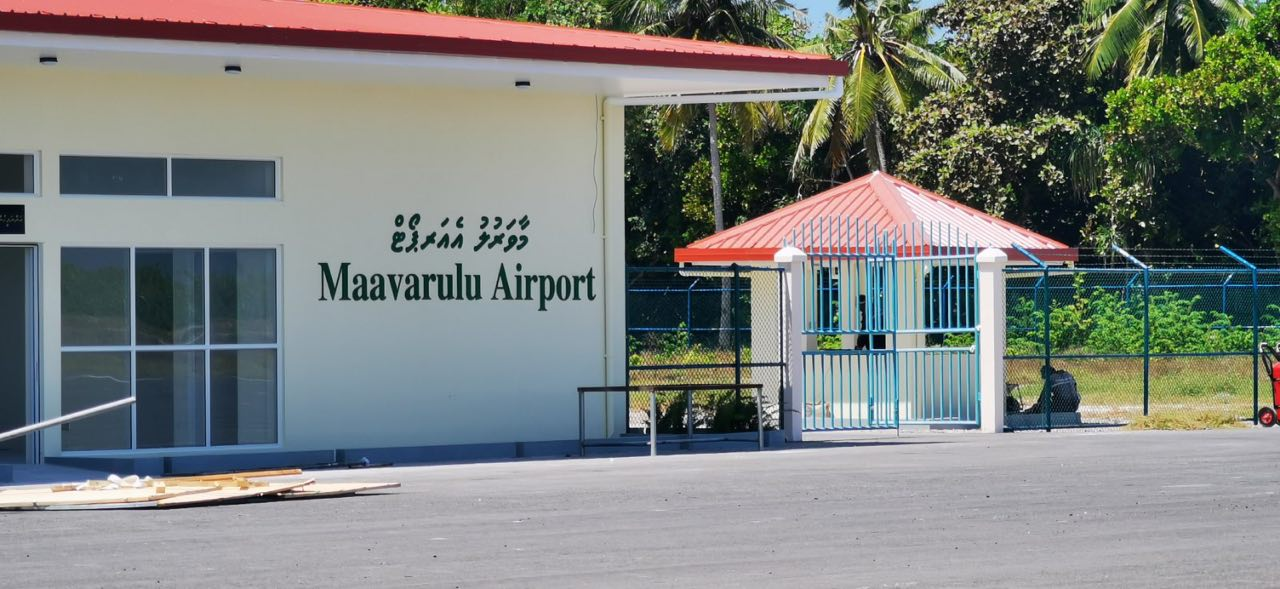
- IATA: RUL; ICAO: VRQM

Summary
- Airport type: Public
- Operator: Regional Airports Company Limited
- Serves: Gadhdhoo, Gaafu Dhaalu Atoll, Maldives
- Location: G.Dh Maavarulu
- Elevation AMSL: 2 m / 7 ft
- Coordinates: 00°20′12″N 073°30′41″E

Map
- Location in Maldives

Runways
Direction	Length		Surface
Direction	m	ft	Surface
06/24	1,200	3,937	Asphalt
- Sources: IATA

Maavarulu Airport (IATA: RUL, ICAO: VRQM) is a domestic airport located on Maavarulu, one of the islands of the Gaafu Dhaalu Atoll in Maldives. Scheduled Flights started on 4 July 2020.

== Facilities ==
The airport resides at an elevation of 2 metres (6 ft 7 in) above mean sea level. It has one runway which is 1,200 metres (3,937 ft) in length and 40 metres (131 ft) wide.

== Airlines and destinations ==
Airlines	Destinations
Maldivian	Gan, Kaadedhdhoo, Kooddoo, Malé

== See also ==
- List of airports in the Maldives
- List of airlines of the Maldives
