= Duckson Puslas =

Sri Lankan footballer (1990–2022)

Personal information
- Full name: Yogendran Duckson Puslas
- Date of birth: 4 April 1990
- Place of birth: Mannar, Sri Lanka
- Date of death: 26 February 2022 (aged 31)
- Place of death: Maldives
- Height: 1.76 m (5 ft 9 in)
- Position: Defender

Senior career*
Years	Team	Apps	(Gls)
- New Youngs
- Colombo FC
–2020	New Youngs		
2020–2021	TC Sports Club		
2021–2022	Club Valencia		

International career
2018–2021	Sri Lanka	21	(0)
- * Club domestic league appearances and goals

Yogendran Duckson Puslas (4 April 1990 – 26 February 2022) was a Sri Lankan professional footballer who played as a defender for TC Sports Club and Sri Lanka national team. He was recognised as one of the stalwarts of Sri Lankan defence line-up.

== Career ==
In 2020, Puslas signed for Maldivian side TC Sports Club.Later, he received a contract to play for Maldivian Club Valencia ahead of the 2021–22 season.

He was included in the Sri Lankan squad which competed at the 2021 SAFF Championship. Duckson played an influential role in Sri Lanka's 0–0 goalless draw against India during the 2021 SAFF Championship group stage match which also ended Sri Lanka's losing streak against India after a long gap of 18 years. He was awarded the player of the match for his contributions which led to a goalless draw. He was an integral member of the Sri Lankan team which emerged as runner-up to Seychelles in the final of the 2021 Four Nations Football Tournament which was held in Sri Lanka where Seychelles emerged victorious in penalty shootout.

Prior to his untimely death, he was playing for Club Valencia in the Dhivehi Premier League. However, he was not included in the Valencia lineup in a group stage match which was held on 26 February 2022 (the death took place on the same day) in the 2020–21 Dhivehi Premier League due to sustaining injuries.

== Personal life and death ==
Puslas died on 26 February 2022, at the age of 31. He was found dead in his apartment during his stay in Maldives. His cause of death is speculated to be a suicide but the cause of his death is yet to be determined and yet to be confirmed by the officials as it is largely unknown.
