= Atsushi Yonezawa =

Japanese footballer

Personal information
- Full name: Atsushi Yonezawa
- Date of birth: 3 August 1985 (age 41)
- Place of birth: Osaka, Japan
- Height: 1.80 m (5 ft 11 in)
- Position: Forward

Team information
- Current team: Super United

Youth career
- 1998–2003: JEF United Ichihara Youth
- 2004–2007: Chuo University

Senior career*
Years	Team	Apps	(Gls)
2013–2014	Royal Wahingdoh FC	16	(6)
2014	Persiba Bantul	12	(8)
2014–2015	Zwegabin United	14	(6)
2015–2016	Aizawl FC	4	(0)
2016	Minerva Punjab FC	14	(4)
2016–2018	Aizawl FC	0	(0)
2018–2020	Rahmatganj MFS	3	(0)
2020	Semarak FC		(0)
2020–	Super United		
- * Club domestic league appearances and goals as of 03 January 2020

Atsushi Yonezawa (米澤 淳司, Yonezawa Atsushi; born 3 August 1985) is a Japanese professional footballer who plays as a forward for Super United in the Dhivehi Premier League.

== Career ==
He had joined Persiba Bantul on 6 June 2014.

On 24 December 2014, he signed for Zwekapin United together with Durica Zuparic, Tihomir Zivkovic and Dragan Cicovic.

== Club career statistics ==
As of January 31, 2019

Club performance			League		Cup		League Cup		Total	
Season	Club	League	Apps	Goals	Apps	Goals	Apps	Goals	Apps	Goals
India			League		India Cup		League Cup		Total	
2013	Royal Wahingdoh FC	I-League 2nd Division	6	2	0	0	0	0	6	2
2014	Royal Wahingdoh FC	I-League 2nd Division	10	4	0	0	0	0	10	4
Indonesia			League		Indonesia Cup		League Cup		Total	
2014	Persiba Bantul	Indonesia Super League	12	8	0	0	0	0	12	8
Myanmar			League		Myanmar Cup		League Cup		Total	
2015	Zwegabin United	Myanmar National League	14	6	0	0	0	0	14	6
India			League		India Cup		League Cup		Total	
2015–16	Aizawl FC	I-League	4	0	0	0	0	0	4	0
2015–16	Minerva Punjab FC	I-League	14	4	0	0	0	0	14	4
2016-17	Aizawl FC	I-League	0	0	0	0	0	0	0	0
2017-18	Aizawl FC	I-League	0	0	0	0	0	0	0	0
Bangladesh			League		Federation Cup		Independence Cup		Total	
2018–19	Rahmatganj MFS	Bangladesh Premier League	3	0	2	0	0	0	5	0
Total
Total	India		16	6	0	0	0	0	16	6
Total
Total	Indonesia		12	8	0	0	0	0	12	8
Total
Total	Myanmar		14	6	0	0	0	0	14	6
Total
Total	India		4	0	0	0	0	0	4	0
Total
Total	Bangladesh		3	0	2	0	0	0	5	0
Career total			65	24	2	0	0	0	67	24
