= Kooddoo Airport =

Kooddoo Airport Maldives ކޫއްޑޫ އެއަރޕޯޓް
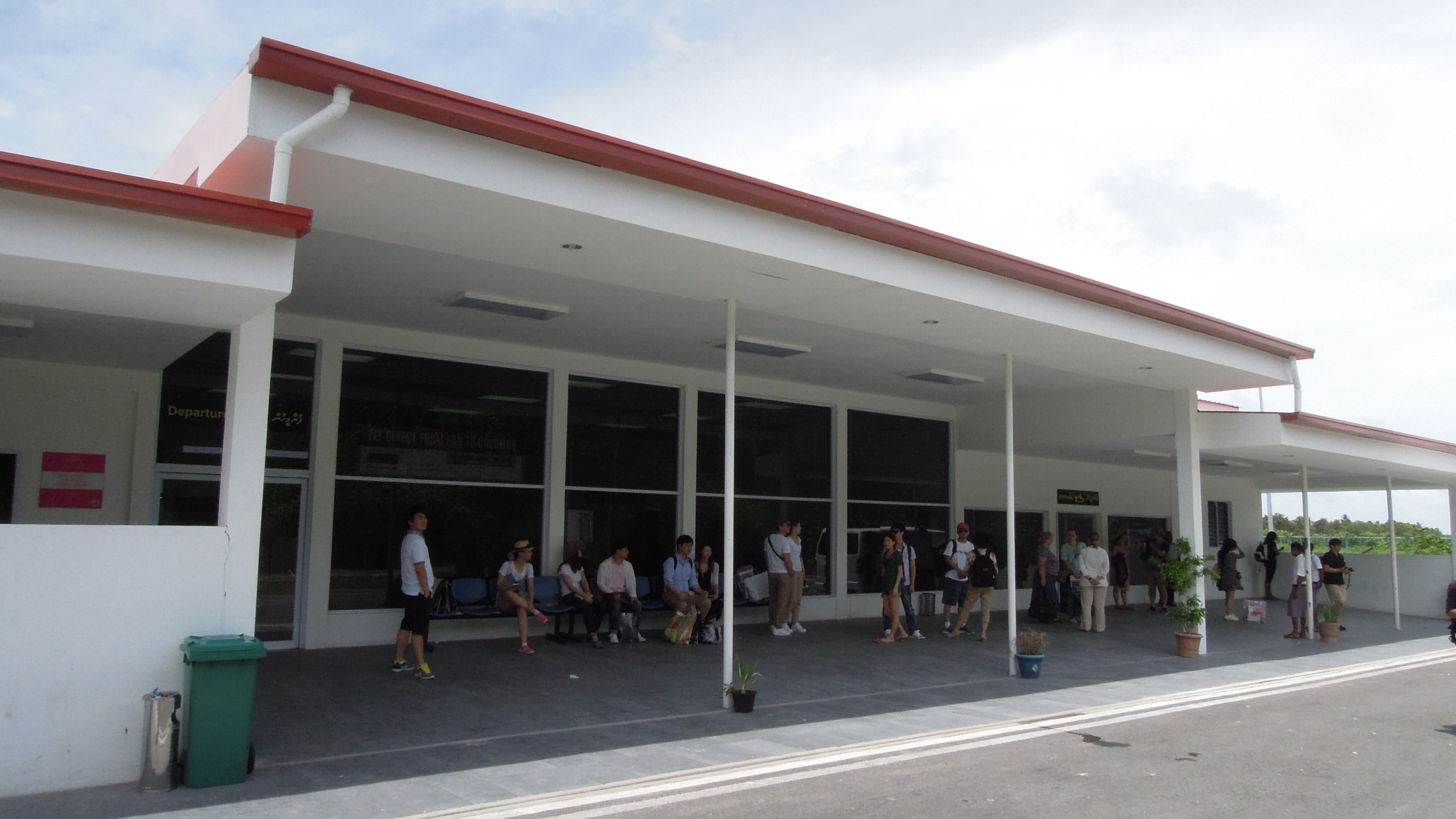
- IATA: GKK; ICAO: VRMO

Summary
- Airport type: Public
- Owner/Operator: Pristine Island Investment
- Serves: Huvadhu Atoll, Maldives
- Location: Kooddoo, Gaafu Alifu Atoll
- Coordinates: 00°43′51″N 073°25′59″E

Map
- Location in Maldives

Kooddoo Airport (IATA: GKK, ICAO: VRMO) is a domestic airport. It is located on the island of Kooddoo in Gaafu Alifu Atoll in the Maldives. It was opened on 10 September 2012 by President Mohamed Waheed Hassan.

== History ==
The Airport was constructed by Bonavista (Maldives) Pvt Ltd in 2012 and was opened by president Mohamed Waheed Hassan. It was later renovated in 2017 by Pristine Island Investment and was opened by president Abdulla Yameen, which included a new VIP lounge and two staff accommodation blocks.

In 2024, the Maldivian airline halted flights to the airport after the airport's runway damaged two of the wings of a plane. The Minister of Transport and Civil Aviation Mohamed Ameen, has said that the operator, Pristine Island Maldives, will renovate the runway as well as the apron.

== Airlines and destinations ==
Airlines	Destinations
Maldivian	Gan, Kadhdhoo, Malé

== See also ==
- List of airports in the Maldives
- List of airlines of the Maldives
