= Maamendhoo (Gaafu Alifu Atoll) =

- Inhabited island
- Location in Maldives
- Coordinates: 00°43′05″N 73°26′25″E
- Country: Maldives
- Administrative atoll: Gaafu Alif Atoll
- Distance to Malé: 382.36 km (237.59 mi)

Dimensions
  - Length: 1.425 km (0.885 mi)
  - Width: 0.430 km (0.267 mi)

Population (2024)
  - Total: 1,690 (including foreigners)
- Time zone: UTC+05:00 (MST)

Maamendhoo (Dhivehi: މާމެންދޫ) is one of the inhabited islands of Gaafu Alif Atoll.

== Geography ==
The island is 382.36 km (238 mi; 206 nmi) south of the country's capital, Malé.
