= Mohamed Siyaz =

Personal information
- Full name: Mohamed Siyaz
- Date of birth: 5 August 1974 (age 52)
- Place of birth: Malé, Maldives

Team information
- Current team: Victory Sports Club (head coach)

Managerial career
- Years: Team
- 2009–2012: New Radiant
- 2013–2014: Mahibadhoo ZJ
- 2017: Kudahuvadhoo FT
- 2018–2021: Club Eagles
- 2021: Super United Sports
- 2021–2022: Maziya S&RC
- 2023–2024: Club Eagles
- 2025: Maldives
- 2026–: Victory Sports Club

Mohamed Siyaz , commonly known as Mohan, is a Maldivian professional football manager who is the head coach of Dhivehi Premier League club Victory.

== Coaching career ==
=== Club career ===
Shiyaz has managed some of the biggest clubs in the Maldives, including New Radiant S.C., Club Eagles, Maziya S&RC, and Super United Sports.

=== International career ===
Siyaz's involvement with the national setup began early in his career. He served as a member of the coaching staff for the Maldives national football team during their historic victory at the 2008 SAFF Championship. He has also previously served as the technical director of the Football Association of Maldives (FAM) and coached the Maldives U23 national team.

On 21 August 2025, Shiyaz was appointed as the head coach of the senior national team on a three-month contract, succeeding Ali Suzain.He led the team during the 2027 AFC Asian Cup qualification campaign. His short-term contract concluded in November 2025, following the team's match against the Philippines.

On 28 February 2026, Siyaz was appointed as the head coach of Victory Sports Club.

== Honours ==
=== Manager ===
New Radiant SC

- Dhivehi Premier League: 2012

Club Eagles

- FAM Youth Championship: 2022

TC Sports Club

- FAM Youth Championship: 2024

=== Assistant Manager ===
Maldives

- SAFF Championship: 2008
