= 2020 Maldivian Second Division Football Tournament =

Second Division
- Season: 2019–20
- Dates: 15 January – 20 February 2020
- Champions: Club Valencia
- Promoted: Club Valencia; Super United Sports
- Matches: 19
- Goals: 63 (3.32 per match)
- Top goalscorer: Adam Nizam (SUS); Samuel Dedy (Valencia) (7 goals each)

This page includes statistics of Second Division Football Tournament in the 2020 season.

2018 Third Division Football Tournament champions Rock Street Sports Club decided not to play in second division despite promotion, relegating them to Maldivian Third Division Football Tournament.

On 13 October 2019, President of Football Association of Maldives, Bassam Adeel Jaleel, announced that Maldives Under 19 would compete in the Second Division Football Tournament from the 2020 season onward.

The winners of the semi-finals, Club Valencia and Super United Sports, advanced to the final, with gaining automatic promotion to the Dhivehi Premier League for the following season, as New Radiant Sports Club and Victory Sports Club were both suspended. Both New Radiant and Victory would have to play in the Second Division Football Tournament even if their suspension cast aside.

== Teams ==
A total of nine teams competed in the league.

=== Personnel and sponsoring ===
Team	Coach	Captain	Sponsor
BG Sports	(Maldives) Muaviyath Ilham	(Maldives) Solah	–
Club PK	(Maldives) Fareed Mohamed	(Maldives) Hussain Fayaz	–
Club Valencia	(Maldives) Ilmau Hussain Ibrahim	(Maldives) Ahmed Rilwan	–
Dhivehi Sifainge Club	(Maldives) Mohamed Athif	(Maldives) Hassan Fawaaz	–
JJ Sports	(Maldives) Assad Abdul Ghanee	(Maldives) Mohamed Shaffaz	Jersey Shop MV
Kuda Henveiru	(Maldives) Afiu Mohamed Hamid	(Maldives) Ahmed Zaad	–
Mahibadhoo	(Maldives) Hussain Abbas	(Maldives) Adam Mauroof	–
Maldives U19	(Maldives) Ahmed Nashid	(Maldives) Ahnaf Rasheed	Bank of Maldives
Super United Sports	(Maldives) Ibrahim Shafiu	(Maldives) Ismail Aaiz Hameed	Allied Insurance (home); Sports Emporium MV (away)

== Group stage ==
From each group, the top two teams would advance to the semi-finals.

All times listed are Maldives Standard Time. UTC+05:00

Key to colors in group tables
Teams that advance to the semi-finals: Group winners; Group runners-up

=== Group 1 ===
Team	Pld	W	D	L	GF	GA	GD	Pts
Super United Sports	4	3	1	0	9	4	+5	10
JJ Sports	4	3	0	1	12	6	+6	9
Dhivehi Sifainge Club	4	2	0	2	6	6	0	6
Mahibadhoo	4	1	1	2	7	11	−4	4
Maldives U19	4	0	0	4	1	8	−7	0

15 January 2020
16:00

Dhivehi Sifainge Club	1 – 3	JJ Sports
Ibrahim Farish 12'	Report	20', 86' Ali Haafiz; 28' Hussain Simaz

National Football Stadium, Malé
15 January 2020
21:00

Mahibadhoo	2 – 2	Super United Sports
Adam Zareef 25'; Adam Fahumaan 71'	Report	13' Ali Shifau; 32' Mohamed Thilmizy

National Football Stadium, Malé
21 January 2020
16:00

Dhivehi Sifainge Club	1 – 3	Super United Sports
Hussain Hafiz 28'	Report	29' Ali Shifau; 76', 85' Adam Nizam

National Football Stadium, Malé
21 January 2020
21:00

JJ Sports	1 – 0	Maldives U19
Ahmed Hunaif 39'	Report

National Football Stadium, Malé
30 January 2020
16:10

Super United Sports	2 – 0	Maldives U19
Ahmed Ashraf Yoosuf 11'; Adam Nizam 78'	Report

National Football Stadium, Malé
30 January 2020
21:00

Dhivehi Sifainge Club	1 – 0	Mahibadhoo
Shaamee Ahmed 74'	Report

National Football Stadium, Malé
4 February 2020
16:10

Mahibadhoo	2 – 1	Maldives U19
Shuaid Saeed 46'; Ahmed Fuad 61'	Report (in Dhivehi)	81' Haisam Rasheedh

National Football Stadium, Malé
4 February 2020
21:00

Super United Sports	2 – 1	JJ Sports
Adam Nizam 11', 52'	Report (in Dhivehi)	62' Abhishek Rijal

National Football Stadium, Malé
8 February 2020
16:10

Mahibadhoo	3 – 7	JJ Sports
Ahmed Fuad 15'; Ismail Nazeer 81'; Shuaid Saeed 87'	Report (in Dhivehi)	10', 52', 68' (pen.), 90+2' Abhishek Rijal; 17' Ahmed Aiham; 37' Ali Nafiu; 51' Ali Haafiz

National Football Stadium, Malé
8 February 2020
21:00

Dhivehi Sifainge Club	3 – 0	Maldives U19
Guerrero Nahuel Jesus 11'; Shaamee Ahmed 46', 59'	Report

National Football Stadium, Malé

=== Group 2 ===
Team	Pld	W	D	L	GF	GA	GD	Pts
Club Valencia	3	2	1	0	7	3	+4	7
Club PK	3	2	0	1	4	3	+1	6
Kuda Henveiru	3	0	2	1	3	4	−1	2
BG Sports	3	0	1	2	2	6	−4	1

16 January 2020
16:00

Club PK	1 – 2	Club Valencia
Shifaz Adil 31'	Report	8' Samuel Dedy Irie; 43' Hussain Faisal

National Football Stadium, Malé
19 January 2020
16:00

Kuda Henveiru	1 – 1	BG Sports
Yoosuf Moosa 41'	Report	60' Hussain Suhail

National Football Stadium, Malé
25 January 2020
21:00

Club PK	2 – 1	Kuda Henveiru
Shifaz Adil 45+1'; Boadu Prince 50'	Report	79' (pen.) Mohamed Nasid Ahmed Naseem

National Football Stadium, Malé
28 January 2020
16:10

Club Valencia	4 – 1	BG Sports
Abdulla Mudhuhath Fahmy 17', 90+2'; Samuel Dedy Irie 26', 44'	Report	90+1' Ibrahim Jaah Ziyad

National Football Stadium, Malé
3 February 2020
16:10

Club Valencia	1 – 1	Kuda Henveiru
Duckson Pulas Yogendran 32' (o.g.)	Report (in Dhivehi)	38' Ahmed Zaad

National Football Stadium, Malé
3 February 2020
21:00

Club PK	1 – 0	BG Sports
Abdulla Muaz 18'	Report (in Dhivehi)

National Football Stadium, Malé

== Semi-finals ==
14 February 2020
16:10

Super United Sports	2 – 1	Club PK
Huzaifath Rasheed 10'; Adam Nizam 14'	Report (in Dhivehi)	27' (pen.) Boadu Prince

National Football Stadium, Malé
14 February 2020
21:00

Club Valencia	3 – 2	JJ Sports
Hussain Niyaz Mohamed 40'; Samuel Dedy Irie 67', 72'	Report (in Dhivehi)	17', 81' Ali Nafiu

National Football Stadium, Malé

== Final ==
20 February 2020
21:00

Super United Sports	1 – 3	Club Valencia
Adam Nizam 27'	Report (in Dhivehi)	38', 89' Samuel Dedy Irie; 50' Abdulla Midhuhath Fahmy

National Football Stadium, Malé

== Awards ==
Award	Details
Best Player	Adam Nizam (Super United Sports)
Best Goalkeeper	Mohamed Jazlaan (Club Valencia)
Fair Play Team	Mahibadhoo SC

== Final ranking ==
Pos	Team	Pld	W	D	L	GF	GA	GD	Pts	Final result
1	Club Valencia (C, Q)	5	4	1	0	13	6	+7	13	Champions & promoted to 2020–21 Dhivehi Premier League
2	Super United Sports (Q)	6	4	1	1	12	8	+4	13	Runners-up & promoted for 2020–21 Dhivehi Premier League
3	JJ Sports	5	3	0	2	14	9	+5	9	Semi finalists
4	Club PK	4	2	0	2	5	5	0	6	Semi finalists
5	Dhivehi Sifainge Club	4	2	0	2	6	6	0	6	Eliminated in group stage
6	Mahibadhoo	4	1	1	2	7	11	−4	4	Eliminated in group stage
7	Kuda Henveiru	3	0	2	1	3	4	−1	2	Eliminated in group stage
8	BG Sports	3	0	1	2	2	6	−4	1	Eliminated in group stage
9	Maldives U19	4	0	0	4	1	8	−7	0	Eliminated in group stage

(C) Champions; (Q) Qualified for the phase indicated

Per statistical convention in football, matches decided in extra time are counted as wins and losses, while matches decided by penalty shoot-out are counted as draws.
