= Kanduhulhudhoo =

- village Inhabited island
- Location in Maldives
- Coordinates: 00°21′15″N 73°32′35″E
- Country: Maldives
- Administrative atoll: Gaafu Alif Atoll
- Distance to Malé: 422.54 km (262.55 mi)

Dimensions
  - Length: 1.125 km (0.699 mi)
  - Width: 0.370 km (0.230 mi)

Population (2014)
  - Total: 533 (including foreigners)
- Time zone: UTC+05:00 (MST)

Kanduhulhudhoo (Dhivehi: ކަނޑުހުޅުދޫ) is one of the inhabited islands of Gaafu Alif Atoll.

== Geography ==
The island is 422.54 km (263 mi; 228 nmi) south of the country's capital, Malé.

== Demography ==
Historical population
Year	Pop.	±%
2006	443	—
2014	505	+14.0%
2006-2014: Census populations Source:
