= Kondey =

- Inhabited island
- Location in Maldives
- Coordinates: 00°29′55″N 73°32′55″E
- Country: Maldives
- Administrative atoll: Gaafu Alif Atoll
- Distance to Malé: 406.58 km (252.64 mi)

Dimensions
  - Length: 2.240 km (1.392 mi)
  - Width: 0.675 km (0.419 mi)

Population (2014)
  - Total: 272 (including foreigners)
- Time zone: UTC+05:00 (MST)

Kondey or Kondē (Dhivehi: ކޮނޑޭ) is one of the inhabited islands of Northern Huvadhu Atoll, administrative code Gaafu Alifu.

The master carpenters of the iconic Male' Hukuru Miskiy were from Kondey, Ali Maavadi Kaleyfaanu and Mahmud Maavadi Kaleyfaanu.

== History ==
=== Archaeology ===
This island has large ruins from the historical Maldivian Buddhist era.

- A ruined Stupa called “Kondey Haviththa” is on the east of the island, about 800 feet (240 m) from the shore. It is 47 feet (14 m) square and 4 feet (1.2 m) high.
- On the south-west of the island, about 500 feet (150 m) from the above, there is another “Haviththa” which is 50 feet (15 m) square and 4 feet (1.2 m) high.
- On the southern fringes, about 400 feet (120 m) away from the shore there is another “Haviththa” measuring 60 feet (18 m) square and 6 feet (1.8 m) in height. It has a depression at the centre which is 7 feet (2.1 m) in diameter and 2 feet (0.61 m) in depth.

Besides the above there are other ruins scattered all over the island. None of them have been properly investigated, although a Makara (sea monster) head in stone was found during Thor Heyerdahl's expedition. Mr. Muhammad Lutfee is seen holding this Makara head in one of the pictures of Thor Heyerdahl's book. The Makara was a common embellishment in classical Hindu and Buddhist temples.

== Geography ==
The island is 406.58 km (253 mi; 220 nmi) south of the country's capital, Malé. It is a long wooded island located on Huvadu Atoll's eastern rim.

== Demography ==
Historical population
Year	Pop.	±%
2006	213	—
2014	259	+21.6%
2006-2014: Census populations Source:
