= Nikola Vujanac =

Serbian footballer (born 1991)

Personal information
- Date of birth: 22 June 1991 (age 35)
- Place of birth: Kraljevo, SFR Yugoslavia
- Height: 1.92 m (6 ft 4 in)
- Position: Goalkeeper

Youth career
- Sloga Kraljevo

Senior career*
Years	Team	Apps	(Gls)
2015–2015	Dinamo Vranje	23+	(0+)
2016–2017	Sileks	25	(0)
2017–2018	Akademija Pandev	30	(0)
2018–2019	Belasica	32	(0)
2019	Radnik Surdulica	2	(0)
2020	Zvijezda 09	3	(0)
2020–2021	Maziya		
2021–2022	Novi Pazar	14	(0)
2022	Radnik Surdulica		
2023	BSV Rehden		
2024	Sloga Kraljevo		
- * Club domestic league appearances and goals

Nikola Vujanac (Serbian Cyrillic: Никола Вујанац; born 22 June 1991) is a Serbian footballer who most recently played as a goalkeeper for Sloga Kraljevo. As of January 2024 he was without a football club.

== Career ==
In 2017, Vujanac signed for Macedonian side Akademija Pandev, where he only conceded 1 goal out of 8 penalties. In 2019, Vujanac signed for Radnik (Surdulica) in Serbia, where he made 4 appearances and scored 0 goals. On 26 September 2019, he debuted for Radnik (Surdulica) during a 3–2 win over Trayal. Before the second half of 2019–20, Vujanac signed for Bosnia and Herzegovina club Zvijezda 09. In 2020, he signed for Maziya in the Maldives, helping them win the league. In 2021, he signed for Serbian top flight team Novi Pazar.
