= Marko Ivanovic =

Montenegrin footballer

Personal information
- Date of birth: 30 June 1995 (age 31)
- Place of birth: Kotor, FR Yugoslavia
- Height: 1.95 m (6 ft 5 in)
- Position: Centre-back

Team information
- Current team: Club Eagles
- Number: 33

Senior career*
Years	Team	Apps	(Gls)
2012-2014	Igalo	21	(0)
2014–2016	St. Andrews	17	(1)
2016–2017	Igalo	4	(0)
2017–2018	Kauno Žalgiris	0	(0)
2018–2019	Senglea Athletic	3	(0)
2019	Kiruna FF	13	(1)
2019–2021	Swieqi United	32	(2)
2021	Igalo	16	(1)
2022	Da Grande	12	(0)
2022–2023	Kirivong Sok Sen Chey	13	(1)
2023	Tiffy Army		
2023–2024	Igalo	30	(3)
2023–	→ Chitwan (loan)	6	(0)
2024	Paro	11	(1)
2025	Gresik United	9	(0)
2025–2026	PSIS Semarang	9	(0)
2026–	Igalo	17	(0)
2026-2027–	Club Eagles	6	(1)
- * Club domestic league appearances and goals as of 16 May 2026

Marko Ivanovic (Serbian Cyrillic: Марко Ивановић; born 30 June 1995) is a Montenegrin professional footballer who plays as a centre-back for Dhivehi Premier League club with Club Eagles. Marko is the first player from Montenegro who ever played in the leagues of Cambodia, Nepal and Bhutan

== Career ==
First professional contract in Malta

St Andrews FC

At just 18 years of age, Marko signed with Maltese Challenge League club St. Andrews F.C. after spending the entire pre-season with the most decorated club on the island, Floriana FC. He decided to make the move to get more playing time. It proved to be the right decision, as the team finished second in the Maltese Challenge League and gained promotion to the Maltese Premier League in the 2014/2015 season. He also managed to score a goal in the Maltese FA Trophy against St. George's FC

FK Kauno Zalgiris

After short spell with his hometown club he signed with Lithuanian A lyga team FK Kauno Zalgiris. He was included in match squad most of the leagues games, but he mainly played for their B team in 2nd Tier which is I Lyga. He made 12 appearances and manage to score 1 goal.

Senglea Athletic FC

In the summer 2018 he signed with Maltese Premier Club.

Swieqi United FC

In the summer 2019 he signed 2years contract with Swieqi United FC in Maltese Challenge League. During his period Swieqi United was one of the best teams fighting hardly for promotion. Neither season could be completed due to the COVID-19 pandemic. Although the team finished fourth in the second season and was on the verge of promotion, the league was prematurely halted, resulting in no promotion or relegation. He made 34 appearances during his time with Swieqi, scoring two goals and providing two assists.

Winning the league in Bhutan and playing in International Competition - AFC Challenge League

Paro FC

On 7 July 2024, he signed for Paro as a first ever Montenegrin player in Bhutan as a reinforcement for the AFC Challenge League. Japanese legend Keisuke Honda previous AC Milan player, was also signed with him. In the qualifying match played in Nepal against Church Boys United the Paro team won 2-1 and Marko Ivanovic assisted on both goals, and made a great contribution to the historic placement in the group stage of the AFC Challenge League competition, which was the first time in the history of the club and the country of Bhutan. In the group stage, they left a good impression, they had 4 points and Marko Ivanovic managed to score a goal against the Lebanese team Nejmeh. Also in the meantime, they won the BOB Premier League Bhutan 2024.

Moving to Indonesia

Gresik United

On 11 January 2025, Ivanovic officially joined Gresik United for the 2024–25 Liga 2 season.

PSIS Semarang

On 21 August 2025, Ivanovic was officially contracted by PSIS Semarang management after passing his medical test. He is expected to share his experience at PSIS and help Laskar Mahesa Jenar perform optimally in the 2025–26 Championship.

== Honours ==
Paro

- Bhutan Premier League: 2024
