= Villingili (Gaafu Alif Atoll) =

Villingili ވިލިނގިލި
- Inhabited island
- Location in Maldives
- Coordinates: 00°45′25″N 73°26′10″E
- Country: Maldives
- Administrative atoll: Gaafu Alif Atoll
- Distance to Malé: 378.07 km (234.92 mi)

Dimensions
  - Length: 3.200 km (1.988 mi)
  - Width: 1.575 km (0.979 mi)

Population (2024)
  - Total: 8,870
- Time zone: UTC+05:00 (MST)

Villingili (Dhivehi: ވިލިނގިލި) is one of the inhabited islands of Gaafu Alif Atoll, which is an administrative division of the Maldives.

== History ==
=== Archaeology ===
According to Mr. Ibrahim Lutfi there was a mound in an area of the island that has been eroded away by the currents on the reef. This mound was probably an ancient Buddhist stupa.

== Geography ==
The island is 378.07 km (235 mi; 204 nmi) south of the country's capital, Malé. It is located on the northeastern rim of Huvadu Atoll. Traditionally this island is also known as 'Huvadu Atoll Vilingili'. Northern Huvadhu Atoll or Gaafu Alifu is an administrative division created on 8 February 1962, when Huvadhu Atoll was divided into two districts.

== Demography ==
Historical population
Year	Pop.	±%
2006	1,976	—
2014	2,554	+29.3%
2022	2,900	+13.5%
2006-2014-2022: Census populations Source:

== Services ==
The World Health Organization has a local unit there.
