= Van-Dave Harmon =

Liberian footballer

Personal information
- Full name: Van-Dave Gbowea Harmon
- Date of birth: 22 September 1995 (age 31)
- Place of birth: Gbalatuah, Liberia
- Height: 1.85 m (6 ft 1 in)
- Position: Forward

Senior career*
Years	Team	Apps	(Gls)
2013–2015	Barrack YC		
2015–2016	Diambars		
2016–2017	Barrack YC		
2018	Metta	12	(5)
2019	1. SC Znojmo	8	(2)
2019–2020	Drenica	12	(6)
2020	Feronikeli	11	(5)
2020–2022	Laçi	44	(5)
2022	JS Saoura	0	(0)
2022–2023	Ballkani	7	(2)
2023–2024	Al-Wahda	5	(0)

International career^{‡}
2016–	Liberia	7	(1)
- * Club domestic league appearances and goals as of 26 November 2023 ‡ National team caps and goals as of 20 April 2023

Van-Dave Gbowea Harmon (born 22 September 1995) is a Liberian footballer who plays as a forward for the Liberia national team.

== Career ==
After playing for Liberian club Barrack YC as well as Diambars in Senegal, Harmon signed for Latvian side Metta, before joining 1. SC Znojmo in the Czech second division.

In 2019, he signed for Kosovar club Drenica. While playing for them, he got a red card during a 1–1 draw with Gjilani after reacting to Franc Veliu's racist remarks.

In 2020, Harmon signed for Laçi in the Albanian top flight.
