= Dhevvadhoo =

- Inhabited island
- Location in Maldives
- Coordinates: 00°33′32″N 73°14′37″E
- Country: Maldives
- Administrative atoll: Gaafu Alif Atoll
- Distance to Malé: 400.97 km (249.15 mi)

Dimensions
  - Length: 0.600 km (0.373 mi)
  - Width: 0.520 km (0.323 mi)

Population (2014)
  - Total: 584 (including foreigners)
- Time zone: UTC+05:00 (MST)

Dhevvadhoo or Devvadū (Div: ދެއްވަދޫ) is one of the inhabited islands of the administrative division known as Northern Huvadhu Atoll (code letter: Gaafu Alifu).

== History ==
Some of the ancient kings of Maldives traced their ancestry to certain families of this island. Dhevvadhoo Rasgefaanu, Al-Sultan Mohamed Ibn Haji Ali Thukkalaa (1692–1701), is one of the Kings in the Maldives.

=== Archaeology ===
There are many Buddhist archaeological remains in Devvadū. It is likely that it was an important island in that period of Maldivian History.

- A mound called "Dhevvadhoo Usgadu", probably a large Stupa is on the north-east of the island, about 285 feet (87 m) from the shore. It is 200 feet (61 m) long, 96 feet (29 m) wide and 4 feet (1.2 m) high.
- A ruin also called "Usgadu", measuring 96 X 64 feet (20 m) with a height of 4 feet (1.2 m) is on the northwest, about 485 feet (148 m) from the shore.
- Near this "Usgadu" there is another mound 116 feet (35 m) long, 52 feet (16 m) wide and 4 feet (1.2 m) high.
- There is a third mound 69 feet (21 m) long 47 feet (14 m) wide and 4 feet (1.2 m) high within this area.
- On the north-west there is another "Usgadu", measuring 120 X 49 feet (15 m) with a height of 4 feet (1.2 m). It is about 385 feet (117 m) away from the shore.

None of these ancient remains have been properly investigated yet.

== Geography ==
The island is 400.97 km (249 mi; 217 nmi) south of the country's capital, Malé. It is a sizeable round island located almost in the centre of Huvadhu Atoll.

== Demography ==
Historical population
| Year | Pop. | ±% |
|---|---|---|
| 2006 | 480 | — |
| 2014 | 505 | +5.2% |
2006-2014: Census populations Source:
