= Gadhdhoo =

- Inhabited island
- Location in Maldives
- Coordinates: 00°17′25″N 73°27′25″E
- Country: Maldives
- Administrative atoll: Gaafu Dhaalu Atoll
- Distance to Malé: 429.63 km (266.96 mi)

Dimensions
  - Length: 1.850 km (1.150 mi)
  - Width: 0.580 km (0.360 mi)

Population (2014)
  - Total: 4,052 (including foreigners)
- Time zone: UTC+05:00 (MST)

Gadhdhoo (Dhivehi: ގައްދޫ), is the second most populated island in Gaafu Dhaalu Atoll. It has its own dialect of Dhivehi which is considerably different from northern and mid-Maldivian speech (more of a southern accent).

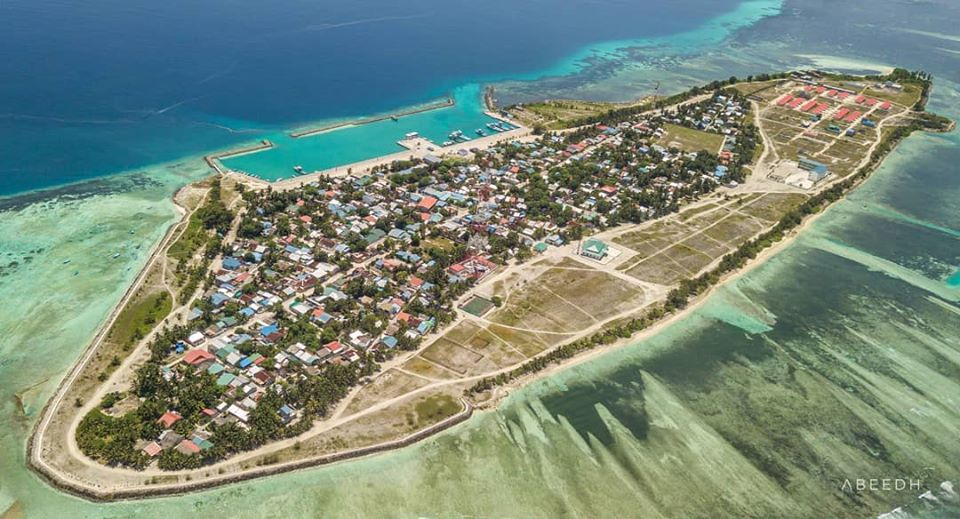
Aerial View of Gadhdhoo

== History ==
=== Secession of the Suvadive Islands ===
In January 1959, the three southern atolls, Huvadhu, Fuvahmulah and Addu, were involved in setting up the breakaway United Suvadive Republic which survived in Addu until September 1963. The name of the secessionist state was taken from the ancient name of this atoll. In some islands, like Gadhdhoo, there was opposition to the secession, and by means of threats and arson, the groups of people opposing the Suvadive state were forced to agree. The capital of Havaru Thinadhoo was burnt down by soldiers sent by then Prime Minister Ibrahim Nasir from Malé during the secession in 1962, after which it was left uninhabited for four whole years and the atoll served its capital at Gadhdhoo more than ten (10) years.

== Geography ==
The island is 429.63 km (267 mi; 232 nmi) south of the country's capital, Malé.

== Demography ==
Historical population
Year	Pop.	±%
2006	1,439	—
2014	1,395	−3.1%
2006-2014: Census populations Source:

== Economy ==
=== Gadhdhoo Kunaa ===
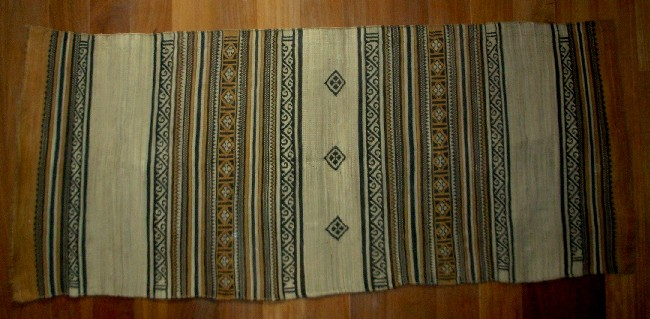
Good quality Gadhdhoo mat

The local women of Gadhdhoo Island weave beautiful mats with patterns in three colors, off-white, yellow and black. These mats are woven using the strands of the bark of Hibiscus tiliaceus (the same tree which is used for making tapa cloth in Polynesia and a kind of local grass called 'hau', which may be dyed in yellow or black. There are two qualities, thinner mats woven with simple knot, or thicker, good-quality mats woven by means of more complex knots.

Traditionally the best Gadhdhoo mats were used by the Maldive Royal House in Malé. Part of the annual tribute from the Huvadu Atoll Chief to the royal court, used to be in the form of Gadhdhoo mats.

Nils-Finn Munch Petersen and Annegrethe Ottovar, two Danish anthropologists visited this island in the 1970s and made extensive research about its mat production and the patterns used on them.

The production of these mats has suffered much from the reckless activity of intermediaries. While a great price is fetched from the tourists, the women who wove them in Gadhdhoo Island received just a small fraction of the amount. Consequently, production and quality declined during the 1980s and have not recovered since. Young girls refused to go through the difficult and long period of apprenticeship because of the low revenue that could be expected in the future(unfortunately the many traditional activities are at risk of disappearing for good).

== Transport ==
The island is served by Maavarulu Airport.
