= Super United Sports =

SUS
- Full name: Super United Sports
- Nicknames: Suspatis; SUS
- Short name: SUS
- Founded: 2016; 10 years ago
- Ground: National Football Stadium, Malé
- Capacity: 11,850
- Owner: Ahmed Afrad
- Head coach: Ismail Mahfooz
- League: Dhivehi Premier League
- 2023: Dhivehi Premier League, 3rd of 10
Home colours	Away colours

Super United Sports, commonly known as SUS or Suspatis, is a Maldivian professional football club based in Machchangolhi in the city of Malé.

== Club history ==
Youth football enthusiasts from Kaaminee Magu of Machchangolhi, Malé, formed a group named Suspatis during the early 2000s and started competing in local sports tournaments. They were officially registered as Super United Sports in 2016. They decided to register in the name Super United Sports, since the abbreviation SUS relates to Suspatis.

Super United Sports got promoted to Second Division as they reached the final of 2018 Third Division, after defeating The Bows Sports Club 13–1 in the semi-final. They were defeated 2–0 in the final to champion Rock Street.

SUS gained promotion to Dhivehi Premier League when the defeated Club PK in 2020 Second Division to reach the final by 2–1. They were defeated to Club Valencia by 3–1 in the final.

At the start of the 2025-26 Dhivehi Premier League SUS announced bankruptcy and withdrew from the Premier League, thus, they were fined and relegated to Third Division.

=== Domestic history ===
Season	League								FA Cup	President's Cup	Top goalscorer		Head coach
Season	Div.	Pos.	Pl.	W	D	L	GS	GA	FA Cup	President's Cup	Name	Goals	Head coach
2016	3rd	Group Stage	3	1	1	1	10	4	–	–			
2017	3rd	Group Stage	3	1	0	2	9	11	–	–			
2018	3rd	2nd	6	4	1	1	38	11	–	–	(Maldives) Ahmed Simhan	10	(Maldives) Abdul Muhusin Hameed
2020	2nd	2nd	6	4	1	1	12	8	–	–	(Maldives) Adam Nizam	7	(Maldives) Ibrahim Shafiu
2020–21	1st	6th	14	3	6	5	9	18	–	–	(7 players)	1	(Maldives) Ahmed Nashid (6 games) (Maldives) Mohamed Shiyaz
2022	1st	7th	21	4	3	14	22	48	–	–			
2023	1st	3rd	14	10	0	4	35	21	–	–			

== Players ==
=== Current squad ===
As of 8 January 2020

Note: Flags indicate national team as defined under FIFA eligibility rules; some limited exceptions apply. Players may hold more than one non-FIFA nationality.

No.	Pos.	Nation	Player
1	GK	MDV	Mohamed Shafeeu
2	DF	MDV	Ahmed Aiham
3	DF	MDV	Hassan Nahwash
4	DF	MDV	Abdulla Haneef
6	DF	MDV	Mamdhooh Ibrahim
7	FW	MDV	Ibrahim Atheeg Hassan
8	MF	MDV	Ahmed Hameed
10	FW	MDV	Ayaaz Ahmed
11	FW	MDV	Yousouf Jahir
12	MF	MDV	Ahmed Farhan
13	DF	MDV	Mohamed Saamir
14	DF	MDV	Aiham
15	MF	MDV	Riham Abdulghani

No.	Pos.	Nation	Player
16	DF	MDV	Ahmed Farrah
18	DF	MDV	Mohamed Rilvan
20	DF	MDV	Ahnaf Rasheed
21	MF	MDV	Yasfad Habeeb
22	GK	MDV	Yoosuf Meesam
23	MF	MDV	Vishah Abdul Majeed
24	MF	MDV	Tholhath Mohamed
25	GK	MDV	Hisaan Abdulrazzag
27	MF	MDV	Nashaah Ahmed
30	FW	MDV	Mohamed Sakhaau
37	DF	MDV	Inaan Ahmed
44	DF	MDV	Mohamed Nizam
48	FW	MLI	Mamadou Fofana

== Coaching staff ==
Position	Staff
Manager	
Assistant manager	
Head coach	(Maldives) Ismail Mahfooz
Assistant coach	(Maldives) Fareed Mohamed
Assistant coach	(Maldives) Mo
Goalkeeper coach	
Medical Officer	(Maldives) Sharafudheen
Officials	(Maldives) Ahmed shifau
Officials	(Maldives) Gani gadhir

== Honours ==
=== League ===
- Second Division

Runners-up: 2020

- Third Division

Runners-up: 2018
