= Gemanafushi =

- Inhabited island
- Location in Maldives
- Coordinates: 00°26′33″N 73°34′05″E
- Country: Maldives
- Administrative atoll: Gaafu Alif Atoll
- Distance to Malé: 412.81 km (256.51 mi)

Dimensions
  - Length: 1.450 km (0.901 mi)
  - Width: 0.500 km (0.311 mi)

Population (2014)
  - Total: 1,800(including foreigners)
- Time zone: UTC+05:00 (MST)

Gemanafushi (Dhivehi: ގެމަނަފުށި) is one of the inhabited islands of Gaafu Alif Atoll.

== Geography ==
The island is 412.81 km (257 mi; 223 nmi) south of the country's capital, Malé.

== Demography ==
Historical population
Year	Pop.	±%
2006	1,082	—
2014	1,160	+7.2%
2006-2014: Census populations Source:
