= Dhidhdhoo =

Dhidhdhoo ދިއްދޫ
- Island
- Location in Maldives
- Coordinates: 6°53′24″N 73°6′24″E
- Country: Maldives
- Geographic atoll: Thiladhunmathi Atoll
- Administrative atoll: Haa Alif Atoll
- Distance to Malé: 303.5 km (188.6 mi)

Government
  - Council: Dhidhdhoo Island Council

Dimensions
  - Length: 2 km (1.2 mi)
  - Width: 0.72 km (0.45 mi)

Population (2022)
  - Total: 4,765
  - Density: 47/km^{2} (120/sq mi)
- Time zone: UTC+05:00 (MST)
- Area code(s): 650, 20

Dhidhdhoo (Dhivehi: ދިއްދޫ) is the capital of Haa Alif Atoll in the Maldives. Ranked the 2nd most populated island in the north of Maldives after Kulhudhuffushi City. Located in the center of the atoll, Dhidhdhoo is governed by Dhidhdhoo Island Council under the Local Government Authority. This island is famous for having the least crime rates amongst the 10 most populated islands in the nation consecutively for a number of years.

== Development ==
In November 2022, the Ministry of Housing, Land and Urban Development launched a project to address Dhidhdhoo's housing crisis by constructing 75 row houses, each covering 700 square feet. Each unit is designed with three bedrooms, three bathrooms, a living room, a kitchen, a dining area, a laundry room, and a storage room. Although initially scheduled for completion by the end of 2023, the project faced delays due to funding issues. Currently, 73% of the work has been completed, and it is anticipated that the units will be ready for handover by February 2025. The project, contracted to SJ Construction Private Limited for a cost of USD 7.7 million, is part of a broader government initiative to support Dhidhdhoo’s growing population needs. The Dhidhdhoo Island Council is actively involved in selecting applicants for the new housing units.

Dhidhdhoo Airport Project

The Dhidhdhoo Airport project in the Maldives is an infrastructure initiative aimed at expanding transportation access in Haa Alif Atoll. Led by the Maldives Transport and Contracting Company (MTCC), the development includes plans to reclaim approximately 71.8 hectares of land and construct a 1,500-meter runway, a passenger terminal, a fire station, and an airfield lighting system. With a budget allocation of MVR 257.21 million, the project is expected to be financed through contractor funding to accommodate budgetary limitations.

== Education ==
Ha.Atoll Education Centre ( HA.AEC) is located in Dhidhdhoo and is the biggest educational institution in the atoll. Currently 1091 students are studying here. Primary, secondary and higher secondary classes are conducted in this educational facility.

Apart from this, the island has a pre-school and the first Junior college in the nation will be located in Dhidhdhoo. The college will be open for public early next year with an accommodation block for temporary residents.

=== Educational Institutions ===
Haa Alif Atoll Education Centre

Haa Alif Atoll Education Centre, established on February 7, 1982, is a prominent educational institution on Dhidhdhoo Island. The foundation stone for the Centre was laid on November 15, 1980, by then-Minister of Education, Honourable Mr. Mohamed Zahir Hussein. This marked the start of efforts to expand secondary education within the Maldives, with the Centre being the seventh school of its kind in the country.

The construction of the Centre was part of the International Development Association (IDA) and World Bank-funded Education and Training Project, aimed at supporting the Maldivian government’s initiative to extend secondary education opportunities beyond Malé. Initially, the school enrolled 74 students and had a staff of two teachers, focusing on both the National Secondary School Certificate (SSC) and the Cambridge General Certificate of Secondary Education (GCSE O/Level) curricula.

In 1997, the school presented its first cohort for the GCE O/Level exams, establishing a foundation for future academic success. The introduction of English as the medium of instruction in 1998 and the launch of a science stream in 2000 were significant developments in the Centre’s educational offerings.

Junior Collage

The Ministry of Higher Education, Labour, and Skills Development (MOHE) has announced that the Junior College in Dhidhdhoo is expected to be completed by 2025, with plans to begin educational programs soon after. The project, undertaken by the Maldives Transport and Contracting Company (MTCC), is reported to be 90% complete and will include specialized facilities to support a range of academic and vocational programs. The campus will feature advanced laboratories, workshops for vocational training, multipurpose spaces, classrooms, an ICT laboratory, and an auditorium. Additional areas will be designated for administrative services, student support, meeting rooms, study rooms, a library, and a staff room.

== History ==
Historically, the island was uninhabited and was under the administration of Utheemu Gadhuvaru, a royal house in Utheemu. The island was inhabited around the 19th century when the people of Dhonakulhi left their island to escape from the invasion of pirates from Malabar.

During the administration of President Mohamed Amin Didi, Dhidhdhoo refused to take part in the 'Uthuru Gadubadu', an uprising of the people of the northern atolls against the Amin Didi regime.

== Geography ==
The island is 303.5 km (189 mi; 164 nmi) north of the country's capital, Malé. The island lies on the north western tip of Thiladhunmathi Atoll and is separated from the Ihavandhippolhu Atoll by the deep Gallandhoo Kandu channel.

== Demography ==
Historical population
Year	Pop.	±%
2006	2,512	—
2014	2,651	+5.5%
2022	3,412	+28.7%
2025	4,765	+39.7%
2006-2022: Census populations Source:

== Governance ==
Dhidhdhoo Council is the local government body responsible for the governance of the island Dhidhdhoo. The council was created in 2011, with the enactment of the Decentralization Bill, which saw the introduction of local governance to the country.

The majority of councilors, elected in the country's second local council elections in 2014, is from the PPM. The third local election was held in 2017, that elected 5 members due to an amendment to Local Councils Laws. All five members were from Maldives Democratic Party (MDP)

== Culture ==
The culture of Haa Alif Dhidhdhoo has been shaped by various economic and social changes over the years, reflecting the island's rich history and the adaptive spirit of its people.

Historically, many men from Haa Alif Dhidhdhoo worked as fishermen. The island enjoyed direct trade and transportation links with Sri Lanka and India, which were profitable for local merchants. However, this trade was later restricted by the Maldivian government, impacting the island's economy.

Fishing was primarily conducted through local dhonis (traditional fishing boats), which were essential to Dhidhdhoo’s economy. However, this tradition was disrupted when one of the wealthiest individuals in the Maldives relocated many dhonis to Malé, the capital. This move forced local fishermen to seek alternative employment, with some taking on manual labor jobs in Malé, such as transporting sandbags, and others working on vessels based there. This event significantly impacted the cultural landscape of Dhidhdhoo, as fishing had been a core part of the island’s identity.

With the establishment of the tourism industry in the Maldives in the 1990s, many young people from Dhidhdhoo found employment in resorts. This shift led to a cultural change where immediate earnings in the tourism sector often took priority over traditional fishing and even education. As a result, the emphasis on formal education waned, with resort work becoming a primary source of livelihood.

Despite Dhidhdhoo’s historical emphasis on education and innovation, it took years before substantial educational facilities were established locally. The government recently built a junior college on the island. This addition reflects the island’s efforts to modernize and keep pace with the 21st century, though there remains an ongoing transition as the community continues to balance traditional values with modern aspirations.

Family Ties of People of Dhidhdhoo

People of Dhidhdhoo has strong family relation with Minicoy Island of India (Maliku). This is evident even today as there are several Maliku families in Dhidhdhoo who carry the name of Maliku as their family name.

Among the dishes, Hithi (Hichaa bai) is one of the most special dish in Dhidhdhoo and mostly served during the month of Ramazaan. Like Hithi, Bondu is also a very popular candy prepared by people of Dhidhdhoo.
