= Gaafu Alifu Atoll =

Coordinates: 0.729198°N 73.331°E

- Atoll of the Maldives
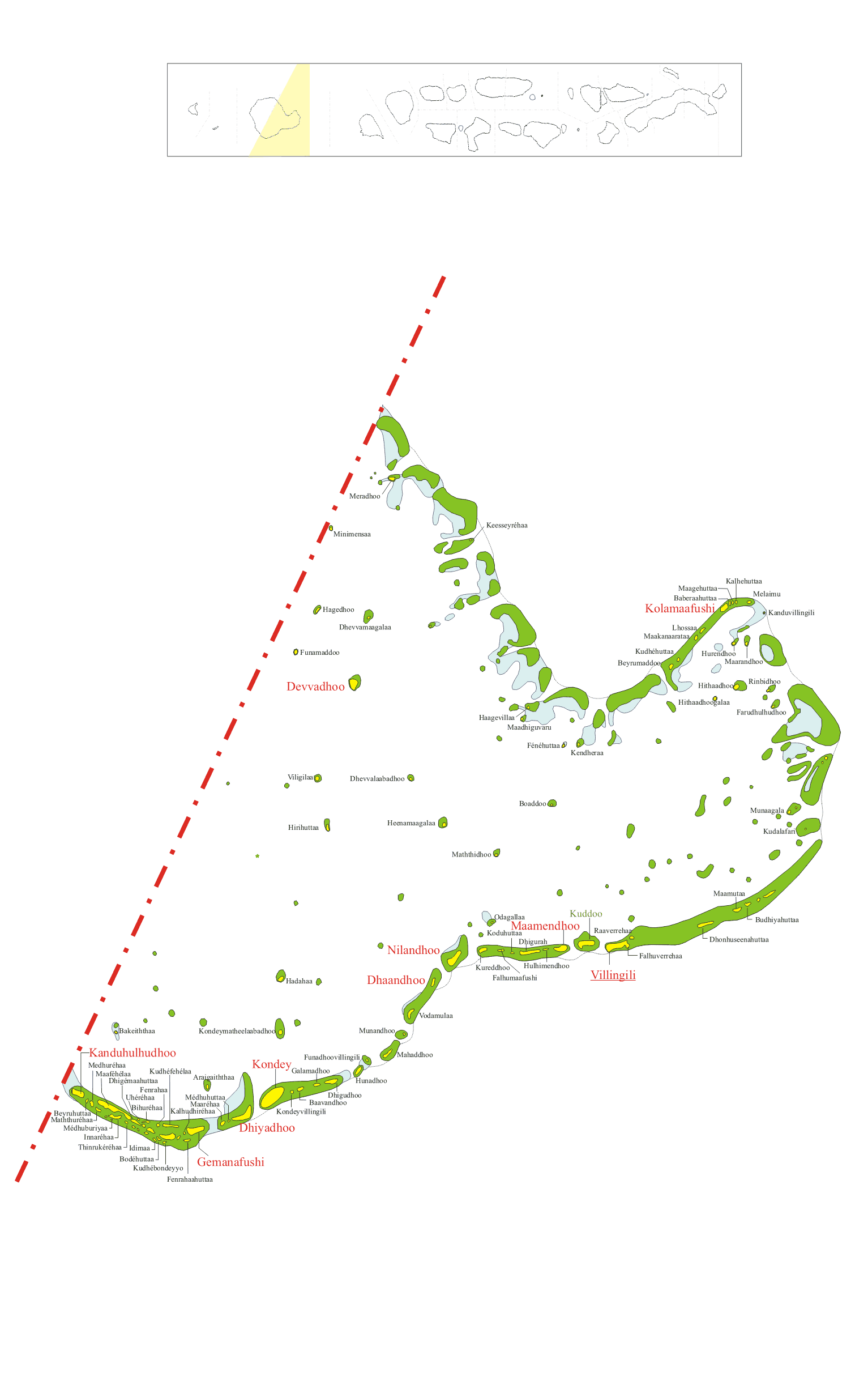

- Location of Gaafu Alifu in Maldives
- Country: Maldives
- Corresponding geographic atoll(s): Huvadhu Atholhu Uthuruburi
- Location: 0° 55' N and 0° 28' N
- Capital: Vilingili

Government
  - Atoll President: Ibrahim Shaheen

Population
  - Total: 8,334
- Letter code: P
- Dhivehi letter code: GA (ގއ)
- Number of islands: 87
- Resort islands(*), airports(¤) and industrial islands are also considered uninhabited.

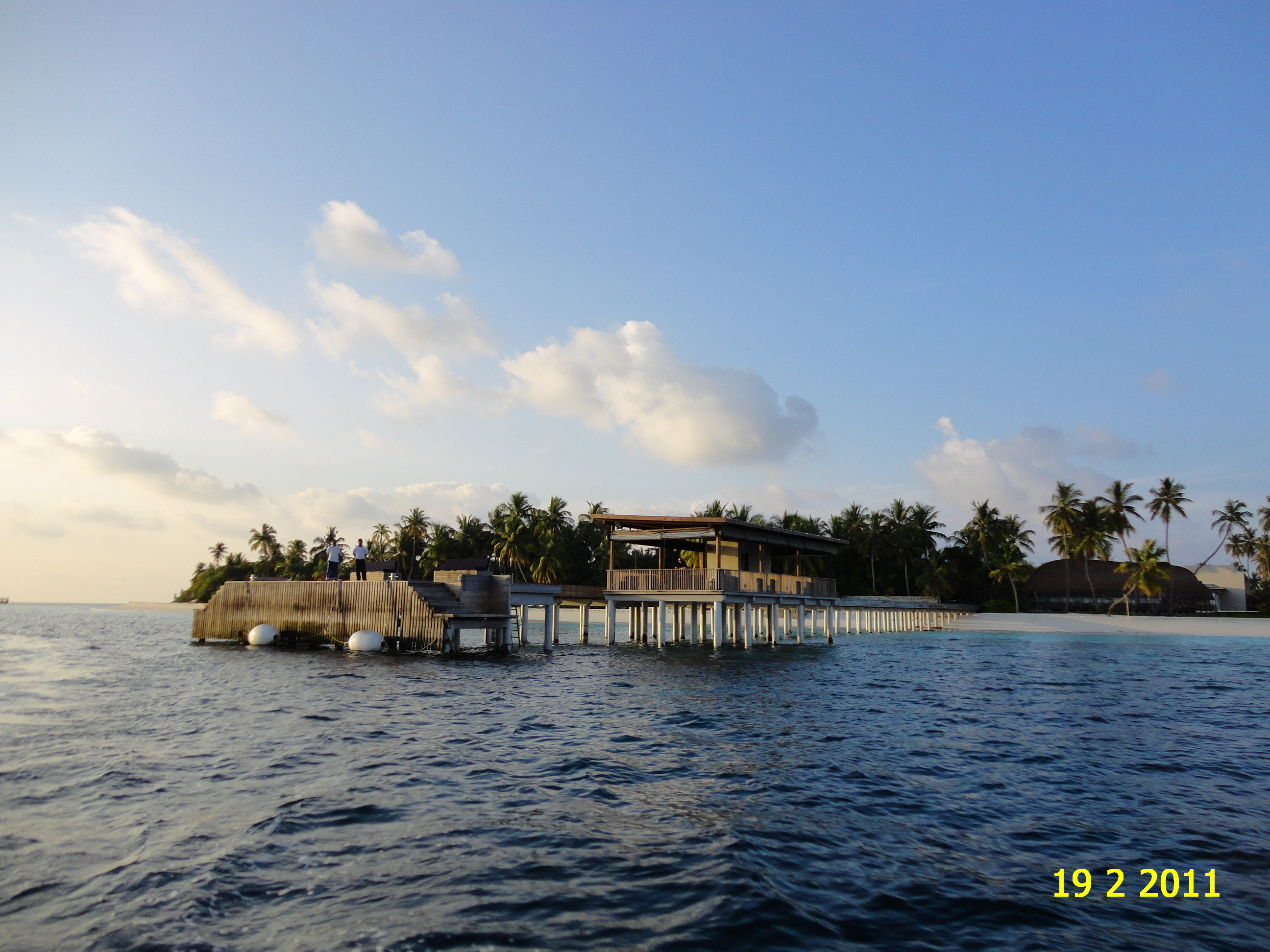
A hotel on Hadahaa

Gaafu Alifu (also known as Northern Huvadhu Atoll or Huvadhu Atholhu Uthuruburi, ހުވަދުއަތޮޅު އުތުރުބުރި) is an administrative division of the Maldives created on February 8, 1962, when Huvadhu Atoll was divided into two districts. Gaafu Alifu corresponds to the northeastern section of this large natural atoll north of the line extending between the channels of Footukandu and Vaarulu Kandu. The capital of this district is Vilingili.

NOTE: Haa Alifu, Haa Dhaalu, Shaviyani, Noonu, Raa, Baa, Kaafu, etc. (including Gaafu Alif) are code letters assigned to the present administrative divisions of the Maldives. They are not the proper names of the natural atolls that make up these divisions. Some atolls are divided into two administrative divisions while other divisions are made up of two or more natural atolls. The order followed by the code letters is from North to South, beginning with the first letters of the Thaana alphabet used in Dhivehi. These code letters are not accurate from the geographical and cultural point of view. However, they have become popular among tourists and foreigners in the Maldives who find them easier to pronounce than the true atoll names in Dhivehi, (save a few exceptions, like Ari Atoll).

== History ==
Some of the ancient kings of Maldives traced their ancestry to certain families of Devvadu Island, located in the centre of the large lagoon. There are many Buddhist archaeological remains in Devvadū, mainly low hills left by ruined stupas. None of these ancient remains has been properly investigated yet.

In January 1959, the three southern atolls: Huvadhu, Fuvahmulah and Addu, were involved in setting up the breakaway United Suvadive Republic which survived until September 1963. The name of the secessionist state was taken from the ancient name of Huvadhu Atoll, "Suvadiva".

== Islands ==
=== Inhabited ===
- Dhaandhoo
- Dhevvadhoo
- Gemanafushi
- Kanduhulhudhoo
- Kolamaafushi
- Kondey
- Maamendhoo
- Nilandhoo
- Vilingili

=== Uninhabited ===
- Araigaiththaa
- Baavandhoo
- Baberaahuttaa
- Bakeiththaa
- Beyruhuttaa
- Beyrumaddoo
- Bihuréhaa
- Boaddoo
- Bodéhuttaa
- Budhiyahuttaa
- Dhevvalaabadhoo
- Dhevvamaagalaa
- Dhigémaahuttaa
- Dhigudhoo
- Dhigurah
- Dhiyadhoo
- Dhonhuseenahuttaa
- Falhumaafushi
- Falhuverrehaa
- Farudhulhudhoo
- Fénéhuttaa
- Fenrahaa
- Fenrahaahuttaa
- Funadhoovillingili
- Funamaddoo
- Galamadhoo
- Hadahaa
- Haagevillaa
- Hagedhoo
- Heenamaagalaa
- Hirihuttaa
- Hithaadhoo
- Hithaadhoogalaa
- Hulhimendhoo
- Hunadhoo
- Hurendhoo
- Idimaa
- Innaréhaa
- Kalhehuttaa
- Kalhudhiréhaa
- Kanduvillingili
- Keesseyréhaa
- Kendheraa
- Koduhuttaa
- Kondeymatheelaabadhoo
- Kondeyvillingili
- Kudalafari
- Kuddoo
- Kudhébondeyyo
- Kudhéfehélaa
- Kudhéhuttaa
- Kureddhoo
- Lhossaa
- Maadhiguvaru
- Maaféhélaa
- Maagehuttaa
- Maakanaarataa
- Maamutaa
- Maarandhoo
- Maaréhaa
- Mahaddhoo
- Maththidhoo
- Maththuréhaa
- Médhuburiyaa
- Médhuhuttaa
- Medhuréhaa
- Melaimu
- Meradhoo
- Minimensaa
- Munaagala
- Munandhoo
- Odagallaa
- Raaverrehaa
- Rinbidhoo
- Thinrukéréhaa
- Uhéréhaa
- Viligillaa
- Vodamulaa
