= 2019–20 Dhivehi Premier League =

Football season in the Maldives

Dhivehi Premier League
- Season: 2019–20
- Dates: 14 June 2019 – 2 March 2020
- Champions: Maziya (2nd title)
- Relegated: Victory; New Radiant
- AFC Cup: Maziya (group stage); Eagles (play-offs)
- Matches: 87
- Goals: 321 (3.69 per match)
- Top goalscorer: (Maldives) Ahmed Rizuvan (28 goals)
- Best goalkeeper: (Afghanistan) Ovays Azizi (9 clean sheets)
- Highest scoring: Maziya 13–0 Nilandhoo (25 June 2019)
- Longest winning run: 9 matches Maziya
- Longest unbeaten run: 11 matches Eagles
- Longest winless run: 16 matches Victory
- Longest losing run: 16 matches Victory

The 2019–20 Dhivehi Premier League was the fifth season of the Dhivehi Premier League, the top-tier football league in the Maldives. The season started on 14 June 2019. TC Sports are the defending champions.

Maziya secured the league title on 19 January 2020.

Since New Radiant Sports Club and Victory Sports Club both teams are suspended, they are relegated to the Second Division Football Tournament.

== Teams ==
A total of nine teams compete in the league. Fehendhoo and Thimarafushi were relegated from the previous season, and were replaced by 2019 Malé League qualification winner United Victory and 2018 Second Division champion Da Grande Sports Club. New Radiant were suspended due to financial reasons.

=== Teams and their divisions ===
Note: Table lists clubs in alphabetical order.

Team	Division
Eagles	Maafannu
Green Streets	Machchangolhi
Da Grande	Maafannu
Foakaidhoo	Sh. Foakaidhoo
Maziya	West Maafannu
Nilandhoo	F. Nilandhoo
TC Sports Club	Henveiru
Victory	Galolhu
United Victory	Galolhu

=== Personnel ===
Note: Flags indicate national team as has been defined under FIFA eligibility rules. Players may hold more than one non-FIFA nationality.

Team	Head coach	Captain
Club Eagles	(Maldives) Mohamed Shiyaz	(Maldives) Hussain Sifaau
Green Streets	(Maldives) Ali Suzain	(Maldives) Ali Ashfaq
Da Grande	(Maldives) Ismail Mahfooz	(Maldives) Mohamed Rasheed
Foakaidhoo	(Maldives) Ali Nisthar Mohamed	(Maldives) Hussain Fazeel
Maziya	(North Macedonia) Marjan Sekulovski	(Maldives) Asadhulla Abdulla
Nilandhoo	(Maldives) Ahmed Mujuthaba	(Maldives) Faruhad Ismail
TC Sports	(Maldives) Mohamed Athif	(Maldives) Ahmed Farrah
United Victory	(Maldives) Mohamed Nazeeh	(Maldives) Ahmed Nashid
Victory	(Maldives) Mohamed Adam	(Maldives) Ibrahim Noorahdhdheen

== Foreign players ==
Club	Visa 1	Visa 2	Visa 3	Visa 4 (Asian)
Club Eagles	(Japan) Toshiki Okamoto			(Sri Lanka) Sujan Perera
Green Streets	(Ukraine) Oleksandr Poslavskyi			
Da Grande	(Ghana) Torsu Christian Dodzi	(Senegal) Babacar Ndiour		(Iraq) Obaida Kadhum Ahmed
Foakaidhoo	(Egypt) Mostafa Seddik	(Egypt) Mahmoud Sayed	(Egypt) Khalil Gamal	(Pakistan) Saqib Hanif
Maziya	(Saint Vincent and the Grenadines) Cornelius Stewart			(Afghanistan) Ovays Azizi
Nilandhoo				
TC Sports	(Nepal) Bimal Gharti Magar			
United Victory	(Serbia) Miloš Kovačević	(Belarus) Dmitri Khlebosolov		(Kyrgyzstan) Bektur Talgat Uulu
Victory	(Uzbekistan) Otabek Khaydarov	(Uzbekistan) Shokhrukhbek Kholmatov	(Togo) Akate Gnama	(Uzbekistan) Alisher Ziyaviddinov

== League table ==
Pos	Team	Pld	W	D	L	GF	GA	GD	Pts	Qualification or relegation (Note: Top six teams continue after each team have played 16 matches.)
1	Maziya (C)	21	16	3	2	74	12	+62	51	Qualification for 2021 AFC Cup group stage
2	Eagles (Note: Due to the COVID-19 pandemic in the Maldives, the 2020 Maldives FA Cup was cancelled and declared null and void by the Football Association of Maldives. As a result, the 2019–20 Dhivehi Premier League runner-ups qualified for the AFC Cup qualifying play-offs.)	21	13	6	2	56	25	+31	45	Qualification for 2021 AFC Cup preliminary round 2
3	TC Sports	21	12	5	4	42	21	+21	41	
4	Green Streets	21	8	5	8	45	41	+4	29	
5	Da Grande	21	7	6	8	33	32	+1	27	
6	Foakaidhoo	21	5	5	11	20	45	−25	20	
7	United Victory	16	4	4	8	26	41	−15	16	
8	Nilandhoo	16	4	2	10	24	54	−30	14	
9	Victory (Note: Victory were suspended after multiple forfeits, all remaining matches were awarded 0–2 losses against them.) (R)	16	0	0	16	1	50	−49	0	Relegation to Maldivian Second Division

Source: Dhivehi Premier League
Rules for classification: 1) Points; 2) Head-to-head points; 3) Head-to-head goal difference; 4) Head-to-head goals scored; 5) Goal difference; 6) Goals scored.
(C) Champions; (R) Relegated

== Season summary ==
=== Round one & two ===
Round 1 ╲ Round 2	MAZ	EAG	GRE	TCS	DGR	FOA	UNV	NIL	VIC
Maziya		1–1	6–1	4–1	3–0	0–0	6–1	13–0	9–0
Eagles	1–0		1–1	3–0	4–2	5–2	4–4	5–1	2–0
Green Streets	1–3	1–1		0–2	3–0	0–0	8–2	6–0	2–0
TC Sports	0–1	1–1	2–2		1–1	1–1	2–4	2–0	4–0
Da Grande	0–1	2–2	1–1	2–3		0–0	1–1	1–1	2–0
Foakaidhoo	2–3	3–2	0–2	0–1	1–2		2–1	2–1	1–0
United Victory	0–2	0–1	0–5	0–2	0–3	1–1		2–2	2–0
Nilandhoo	0–5	2–4	4–2	0–4	0–2	3–2	2–4		6–0
Victory	0–2	1–3	0–2	0–3	0–4	0–2	0–4	0–2	

Updated to match(es) played on unknown. Source:

=== Round three ===
— ╲ Round 3	MAZ	EAG	GRE	TCS	DGR	FOA
Maziya		1–2	5–1	0–0	2–1	7–0
Eagles			4–2	0–1	3–0	7–0
Green Streets				1–5	2–5	2–0
TC Sports					3–1	4–0
Da Grande						3–1
Foakaidhoo						

Updated to match(es) played on unknown. Source:

=== Matches ===
==== First round ====
===== Week 1 =====
14 June 2019 1	Nilandhoo	0–2	Da Grande	National Football Stadium, Malé

15 June 2019 2	TC Sports Club	4–0	Victory	National Football Stadium, Malé

15 June 2019 3	Foakaidhoo	2–1	United Victory	National Football Stadium, Malé

8 July 2019 4	Maziya	1–1	Club Eagles	National Football Stadium, Malé

===== Week 2 =====
19 June 2019 5	Maziya	3–1	Green Streets	National Football Stadium, Malé

19 June 2019 6	Victory	0–4	United Victory	National Football Stadium, Malé

20 June 2019 7	Foakaidhoo	1–2	Da Grande	National Football Stadium, Malé

20 June 2019 8	TC Sports Club	1–1	Club Eagles	National Football Stadium, Malé

===== Week 3 =====
24 June 2019 9	Victory	0–4	Da Grande	National Football Stadium, Malé

24 June 2019 10	Club Eagles	1–1	Green Streets	National Football Stadium, Malé

25 June 2019 11	TC Sports Club	2–0	United Victory	National Football Stadium, Malé

25 June 2019 12	Maziya	13–0	Nilandhoo	National Football Stadium, Malé

===== Week 4 =====
29 June 2019 13	Club Eagles	5–1	Nilandhoo	National Football Stadium, Malé

29 June 2019 14	Maziya	0–0	Foakaidhoo	National Football Stadium, Malé

30 June 2019 15	United Victory	0–3	Da Grande	National Football Stadium, Malé

30 June 2019 16	TC Sports Club	2–2	Green Streets	National Football Stadium, Malé

===== Week 5 =====
4 July 2019 17	TC Sports Club	0–1	Maziya	National Football Stadium, Malé

4 July 2019 18	Green Streets	3–0	Da Grande	National Football Stadium, Malé

5 July 2019 19	Foakaidhoo	1–0	Victory	National Football Stadium, Malé

5 July 2019 20	Nilandhoo	2–4	United Victory	National Football Stadium, Malé

===== Week 6 =====
3 August 2019 21	Green Streets	6–0	Nilandhoo	National Football Stadium, Malé

3 August 2019 22	Maziya	9–0	Victory	National Football Stadium, Malé

4 August 2019 23	Club Eagles	5–2	Foakaidhoo	National Football Stadium, Malé

4 August 2019 24	TC Sports Club	1–1	Da Grande	National Football Stadium, Malé

===== Week 7 =====
8 August 2019 25	Maziya	6–1	United Victory	National Football Stadium, Malé

8 August 2019 26	Club Eagles	3–1	Victory	National Football Stadium, Malé

9 August 2019 27	Green Streets	0–0	Foakaidhoo	National Football Stadium, Malé

9 August 2019 28	TC Sports Club	2–0	Nilandhoo	National Football Stadium, Malé

===== Week 8 =====
18 September 2019 29	Club Eagles	4–4	United Victory	National Football Stadium, Malé

18 September 2019 30	Maziya	3–0	Da Grande	National Football Stadium, Malé

19 September 2019 31	Nilandhoo	3–2	Foakaidhoo	National Football Stadium, Malé

19 September 2019 32	Green Streets	2–0 (awarded)	Victory	National Football Stadium, Malé
Note: Match forfeited as Victory DNS.

===== Week 9 =====
23 September 2019 33	Green Streets	8–2	United Victory	National Football Stadium, Malé

23 September 2019 34	TC Sports Club	1–1	Foakaidhoo	National Football Stadium, Malé

24 September 2019 35	Nilandhoo	6–0	Victory	National Football Stadium, Malé

24 September 2019 36	Club Eagles	2–2	Da Grande	National Football Stadium, Malé

==== Second round ====
On 12 December 2019, Football Association of Maldives decided to suspend Victory Sports Club from the league as a result of multiple forfeits, unpaid wages, and licensing issues. They were suspended and relegated to Maldivian Second Division Football Tournament, and their remaining games were awarded 0–2 against them.

===== Week 10 =====
28 September 2019 37	TC Sports Club	3–0	Victory	National Football Stadium, Malé

28 September 2019 38	Green Streets	1–1	Club Eagles	National Football Stadium, Malé

29 September 2019 39	Maziya	2–0	United Victory	National Football Stadium, Malé

29 September 2019 40	Foakaidhoo	2–1	Nilandhoo	National Football Stadium, Malé

===== Week 11 =====
15 October 2019 41	Foakaidhoo	2–0 (awarded)	Victory	National Football Stadium, Malé
Note: Match forfeited as Victory DNS.

15 October 2019 42	United Victory	2–2	Nilandhoo	National Football Stadium, Malé

16 October 2019 43	Green Streets	1–1	Da Grande	National Football Stadium, Malé

16 October 2019 44	Maziya	0–1	Club Eagles	National Football Stadium, Malé

===== Week 12 =====
20 October 2019 45	United Victory	2–0 (awarded)	Victory	National Football Stadium, Malé
Note: Match forfeited as Victory DNS.

20 October 2019 46	Club Eagles	4–2	Da Grande	National Football Stadium, Malé

21 October 2019 47	Maziya	5–0	Nilandhoo	National Football Stadium, Malé

8 January 2020 48	TC Sports Club	2–0	Green Streets	National Football Stadium, Malé

===== Week 13 =====
25 October 2019 49	Green Streets	2–0	Foakaidhoo	National Football Stadium, Malé

26 October 2019 50	Nilandhoo	2–0 (awarded)	Victory	National Football Stadium, Malé
Note: Match forfeited as Victory DNS.

26 October 2019 51	Maziya	1–0	Da Grande	National Football Stadium, Malé

12 January 2020 52	TC Sports Club	0–3	Club Eagles	National Football Stadium, Malé

===== Week 14 =====
16 December 2019 53	Maziya	6–1	Green Streets	National Football Stadium, Malé

16 December 2019 54	TC Sports Club	4–0	Nilandhoo	National Football Stadium, Malé

17 December 2019 55	Foakaidhoo	1–1	United Victory	National Football Stadium, Malé

17 December 2019 56	Da Grande	2–0 (awarded)	Victory	National Football Stadium, Malé
Note: After multiple forfeits, on 12 December 2019, FAM decided to exclude Victory from the league and suspend them. As a result, all their remaining games are awarded 0–2 against them.

===== Week 15 =====
20 December 2019 57	Da Grande	2–3	TC Sports Club	National Football Stadium, Malé

20 December 2019 58	Green Streets	5–0	United Victory	National Football Stadium, Malé

21 December 2019 59	Club Eagles	2–3	Foakaidhoo	National Football Stadium, Malé

21 December 2019 60	Maziya	2–0 (awarded)	Victory	National Football Stadium, Malé
Note: After multiple forfeits, on 12 December 2019, FAM decided to exclude Victory from the league and suspend them. As a result, all their remaining games are awarded 0–2 against them.

===== Week 16 =====
25 December 2019 61	Green Streets	2–4	Nilandhoo	National Football Stadium, Malé

25 December 2019 62	Club Eagles	1–0	United Victory	National Football Stadium, Malé

26 December 2019 63	Da Grande	0–0	Foakaidhoo	National Football Stadium, Malé

26 December 2019 64	Maziya	4–1	TC Sports Club	National Football Stadium, Malé

===== Week 17 =====
29 December 2019 65	Club Eagles	4–2	Nilandhoo	National Football Stadium, Malé

29 December 2019 66	Green Streets	2–0 (awarded)	Victory	National Football Stadium, Malé
Note: After multiple forfeits, on 12 December 2019, FAM decided to exclude Victory from the league and suspend them. As a result, all their remaining games are awarded 0–2 against them.

30 December 2019 67	TC Sports Club	1–0	Foakaidhoo	National Football Stadium, Malé

30 December 2019 68	Da Grande	1–1	United Victory	National Football Stadium, Malé

===== Week 18 =====
3 January 2020 69	Da Grande	1–1	Nilandhoo	National Football Stadium, Malé

3 January 2020 70	Maziya	3–2	Foakaidhoo	National Football Stadium, Malé

4 January 2020 71	TC Sports Club	2–4	United Victory	National Football Stadium, Malé

4 January 2020 72	Club Eagles	2–0 (awarded)	Victory	National Football Stadium, Malé
Note: After multiple forfeits, on 12 December 2019, FAM decided to exclude Victory from the league and suspend them. As a result, all their remaining games are awarded 0–2 against them.

==== Third round ====
Top six teams enter this round.

===== Week 19 =====
14 January 2020 73	Maziya	7–0	Foakaidhoo	National Football Stadium, Malé

14 January 2020 74	Green Streets	2–5	Da Grande	National Football Stadium, Malé

16 January 2020 75	Club Eagles	0–1	TC Sports Club	National Football Stadium, Malé

===== Week 20 =====
19 January 2020 76	Maziya	5–1	Green Streets	National Football Stadium, Malé

20 January 2020 77	Club Eagles	7–0	Foakaidhoo	National Football Stadium, Malé

20 January 2020 78	TC Sports Club	3–1	Da Grande	National Football Stadium, Malé

===== Week 21 =====
24 January 2020 79	Maziya	2–1	Da Grande	National Football Stadium, Malé

24 January 2020 80	TC Sports Club	4–0	Foakaidhoo	National Football Stadium, Malé

25 January 2020 81	Club Eagles	4–2	Green Streets	National Football Stadium, Malé

===== Week 22 =====
28 January 2020 82	Maziya	0–0	TC Sports Club	National Football Stadium, Malé

29 January 2020 83	Club Eagles	3–0	Da Grande	National Football Stadium, Malé

29 January 2020 84	Green Streets	2–0	Foakaidhoo	National Football Stadium, Malé

===== Week 23 =====
2 February 2020 85	TC Sports Club	5–1	Green Streets	National Football Stadium, Malé

2 February 2020 86	Da Grande	3–1	Foakaidhoo	National Football Stadium, Malé

2 March 2020 87	Maziya	1–2	Club Eagles	National Football Stadium, Malé

== Season statistics ==
As of 2 March 2020

=== Scoring ===
==== Top scorers ====
Rank	Player	Club	Goals
1	(Maldives) Ahmed Rizuvan	Eagles	28
2	(Maldives) Ali Ashfaq	Green Strets / TC Sports	20
3	(Iraq) Obaida Kadum Ahmed	Da Grande	15
3	(Saint Vincent and the Grenadines) Cornelius Stewart	Maziya	15
5	(Maldives) Ishan Ibrahim	TC Sports	13
6	(Maldives) Ismail Easa	TC Sports	12
6	(Maldives) Asadhulla Abdulla	Maziya	12
8	(Maldives) Ibrahim Waheed Hassan	Maziya	10
8	(Maldives) Hamza Mohamed	Maziya	10
10	(Japan) Toshiki Okamoto	Nilandhoo / Eagles	8

==== Hat-tricks ====
Player	For	Against	Result	Date
(Maldives) Ibrahim Waheed Hassan^{5}	Maziya	Nilandhoo	13–0	25 June 2019
(Maldives) Asadhulla Abdulla	Maziya	Nilandhoo	13–0	25 June 2019
(Maldives) Ahmed Rizuvan	Eagles	Nilandhoo	5–1	29 June 2019
(Maldives) Ali Ashfaq	Green Streets	Nilandhoo	6–0	3 August 2019
(Saint Vincent and the Grenadines) Cornelius Stewart	Maziya	Victory	9–0	3 August 2019
(Maldives) Ahmed Rizuvan	Eagles	Foakaidhoo	5–2	4 August 2019
(Maldives) Ali Ashfaq^{5}	Green Streets	United Victory	8–2	23 September 2019
(Ghana) Adoku Kweku Lucas	Nilandhoo	Victory	6–0	24 September 2019
(Maldives) Ahmed Rizuvan	Eagles	Da Grande	4–2	20 October 2019
(Saint Vincent and the Grenadines) Cornelius Stewart	Maziya	Green Streets	6–1	16 December 2019
(Maldives) Ahmed Rizuvan	Eagles	Nilandhoo	4–2	29 December 2019
(Saint Vincent and the Grenadines) Cornelius Stewart	Maziya	Foakaidhoo	7–0	14 January 2020
(Iraq) Obaida Kadum Ahmed^{4}	Da Grande	Green Streets	5–2	16 January 2020
(Maldives) Ahmed Rizuvan^{4}	Eagles	Foakaidhoo	7–0	20 January 2020
(Iraq) Obaida Kadum Ahmed	Da Grande	Foakaidhoo	3–1	2 February 2020

- ^{4} Player scored four goals
- ^{5} Player scored five goals

=== Clean sheets ===
Rank	Player	Club	Clean sheets
1	(Afghanistan) Ovays Azizi	Maziya	9
2	(Pakistan) Saqib Hanif	Foakaidhoo / TC Sports	8
3	(Sri Lanka) Sujan Perera	Eagles	5
4	(Maldives) Mohamed Faisal	Da Grande	4
4	(Ukraine) Oleksandr Poslavskyi	Green Streets	4
5	(Maldives) Imran Mohamed	TC Sports	3
6	(Maldives) Ibrahim Nadheem Adam	TC Sports	2
7	(Maldives) Hassan Aleef Ibrahim	Green Streets	1
7	(Maldives) Tholaal Hassan	United Victory	1
7	(Maldives) Ibrahim Labaan Shareef	Green Streets	1
7	(Maldives) Mohamed Shafeeu	Nilandhoo	1
7	(Maldives) Hussain Shareef	Maziya	1
7	(Maldives) Adam Im'aan	TC Sports	1

== See also ==
- 2020 Maldives FA Cup
