= 2022 Maldives FA Cup =

Maldives FA Cup
Tournament details
- Country: Maldives
- Teams: 9

Final positions
- Champions: Maziya S&RC
- Runners-up: Club Valencia

The 2022 Maldives FA Cup was the 30th edition of the Maldives FA Cup, the premier domestic knockout football competition organized by the Football Association of Maldives.

The tournament marked the return of the FA Cup after several years of disruption, with the previous completed edition having taken place in 2017, when New Radiant defeated TC Sports Club on penalties to secure a record-extending 12th FA Cup title.

An attempt to stage the competition during the 2019–20 season was made; however, the tournament was abandoned at the quarter-final stage and declared null and void due to the COVID-19 pandemic.

The final was played on 21 August 2022, in which Maziya S&RC defeated five-time winners Club Valencia to claim their third FA Cup title. As Maziya had also won the 2022 Dhivehi Premier League, the 2023–24 AFC Cup qualifying play-off spot was instead awarded to the league runners-up, Club Eagles.

== Teams ==
A total of nine teams are participating in the tournament. These include all eight clubs from the 2022 Dhivehi Premier League, along with one team from the Second Division Biss Buru Sports Club.

New Radiant, the most successful club in the history of the competition with 12 titles and the defending champions from the last completed edition in 2017, did not take part in the tournament despite having been cleared from a suspension imposed in 2019.

The official draw for the tournament was held on 3 August 2022 at the FAM House in Malé.

== Play-off ==
12 August 2022
16:00

Super United Sports	10–0	Biss Buru Sports Club
Atheeq 6'; Aiham I 19', 70', 90+2' (pen.); Sakhaau 33'; Husaam 64', 76'; Nasooh 69', 82'; Hameed 87'	Report

National Football Stadium, Malé

== Quarter finals ==
12 August 2022
21:00

Maziya S&RC	3–1	United Victory
Akram 16'; Naiz 66'; Hamza 82'	Report	19' Bassam

National Football Stadium, Malé

13 August 2022
16:00

Club Green Streets	1–1 (a.e.t.)	TC Sports Club
Pulatov 38'	Report	24' Salah
Penalties
Pulatov (penalty scored); Ansar (penalty missed); Nazeem (penalty scored); Faruhadh (penalty scored); Rilwan (penalty scored)	4–3	(penalty scored) Musllih; (penalty missed) Saad; (penalty scored) Ahnaf; (penalty scored) Eenaaz; (penalty missed) Ajufaan

National Football Stadium, Malé

13 August 2022
21:00

Club Valencia	2–1	Da Grande Sports Club
Ashad 14'; Sufianu 18'	Report	55' Hernandez

National Football Stadium, Malé

15 August 2022
16:00

Club Eagles	2–2 (a.e.t.)	Super United Sports
Bruno 31'; Abdulla Ziyan 82'	Report	18' Atheeq; 68' Samir
Penalties
	6–7

National Football Stadium, Malé

== Semi finals ==
18 August 2022
16:00

Maziya S&RC	3–1 (a.e.t.)	Club Green Streets
Akram 45+4'; Hamza 97'; Yaamin 120'	Report	66' Rilwan

National Football Stadium, Malé

18 August 2022
21:00

Club Valencia	1–1 (a.e.t.)	Super United Sports
Haneef 57'	Report	90+2' Husaam
Penalties
Yaameen (penalty scored); Haneef (penalty missed); Ashad (penalty scored); Khalil (penalty scored); Easa (penalty scored); Sufianu (penalty missed); Samdhooh (penalty missed); Midhuhath (penalty scored)	5–4	(penalty missed) Husaam; (penalty scored) Aiham II; (penalty scored) Alaau; (penalty scored) Nasooh; (penalty scored) Aiham I (penalty missed) Nizam; (penalty missed) Farish; (penalty missed) Samir

National Football Stadium, Malé

== Third place match ==
21 August 2022
16:00

Club Green Streets	2–0 Awarded (Note: The third-place match was not played after Super United Sports declined to play due to limited player availability and concerns over their upcoming relegation play-off in the Dhivehi Premier League, they had forfeited the game; the rules for forfeited games deem that the match, and the third plpace, be awarded as a 2–0 win for Club Green Streets.)	Super United Sports
	Report

National Football Stadium, Malé

== Final ==
21 August 2022
21:00

Maziya S&RC	2–0	Club Valencia
Naiz 14'; Hamza 32'	Report

National Football Stadium, Malé
