= 2018 Dhivehi Premier League =

Dhivehi Premier League
- Season: 2018
- Champions: TC Sports
- AFC Cup: TC Sports; Maziya
- Top goalscorer: (Maldives) Ahmed Rizuvan (31 goals)

The 2018 Dhivehi Premier League season is the fourth season of the Dhivehi Premier League, the top-tier football league in the Maldives. It is the second edition held according to its new format. The season features ten teams, increased from eight teams from last season; six teams from 2018 Malé League and four teams from 2018 Minivan Championship.

== Qualified teams ==
Locations of the 2018 Dhivehi Premier League teams

Note: Table lists clubs in alphabetical order.

Team	Qualified format	Ref
Green Streets	2018 Malé League top 6	
Eagles	2018 Malé League top 6	
Fehendhoo	Minivan Championship semi finalist	
Foakaidhoo	Minivan Championship semi finalist	
Maziya	2018 Malé League top 6	
New Radiant	2018 Malé League top 6	
Nilandhoo	Minivan Championship semi finalist	
Thimarafushi	Minivan Championship semi finalist	
TC Sports	2018 Malé League top 6	
Victory	2018 Malé League top 6	

=== Personnel ===
Note: Flags indicate national team as has been defined under FIFA eligibility rules. Players may hold more than one non-FIFA nationality.

Team	Head coach	Captain
Green Streets	(Maldives) Ali Suzain	(Maldives) Ashad Ali
Eagles	(Maldives) Mohamed Shiyaz	(Sri Lanka) Sujan Perera
Fehendhoo	(Maldives) Ismail Anil	(Maldives) Adam Naseem
Foakaidhoo	(Maldives) Ali Nisthar Mohamed	(Maldives)
Maziya	(Maldives) Ismail Mahfooz	(Maldives) Asadhulla Abdulla
New Radiant	(Maldives) Sobah Mohamed	(Maldives) Ali Fasir
Nilandhoo	(Maldives) Assad Abdul Ghanee	(Maldives) Ahmed Ali
Thimarafushih	(Maldives) Amien Shah	(Maldives) Ibrahim Amir
TC Sports	(Maldives) Mohamed Nizam	(Maldives) Farrah Ahmed
Victory	(Maldives) Mohamed Nazeeh	(Maldives) Shafiu Ahmed

== Foreign players ==
Club	Visa 1	Visa 2	Visa 3	Visa 4 (Asian)
A. A. Maalhos	(Spain) Angel Carrasco Muñoz			(Pakistan) Saqib Hanif
Green Streets	(Ukraine) Petro Kovalchuk	(Ukraine) Ilya Sobol	(Slovakia) Viliam Macko	(Japan) Jun Kochi
Dh. Kudahuvadhoo	(Uzbekistan) Abbos Saidov	(Uzbekistan) Jamshid Qosimov		
G. Dh. Thinadhoo	(Spain) Pecharroman Alain			(Kyrgyzstan) Ruslan Dzhanybekov
Maziya	(Serbia) Miloš Kovačević	(Croatia) Andrej Kerić	(Bosnia and Herzegovina) Bojan Mihajlovic	(Syria) Mahmoud Al-Youssef
New Radiant	(Spain) Adrián Gallardo Valdés	(Spain) Candela	(Montenegro) Stevan Marković	(Lebanon) Hussein El-Dor
Sh. Milandhoo				
TC Sports	(Saint Vincent and the Grenadines) Cornelius Stewart	(Egypt) Easa El-Maghrabi	(Egypt) Halil El-Bezawy	(Nepal) Kiran Chemjong

== League table ==
All ten teams play in the first stage. Afterwards, only the top eight teams play in the second stage.

Pos	Team	Pld	W	D	L	GF	GA	GD	Pts	Qualification or relegation
1	TC Sports Club (C)	16	13	0	3	53	12	+41	39	Qualification for 2020 AFC Cup group stage
2	Maziya	16	12	2	2	51	17	+34	38 (Note: Ranked on head-to-head results: Eagles 2–2 Maziya, Eagles 0–1 Maziya.)	Qualification for 2020 AFC Cup preliminary round 2
3	Eagles	16	12	2	2	62	12	+50	38	
4	New Radiant	16	8	4	4	44	22	+22	28	
5	Green Streets	16	8	2	6	35	29	+6	26	
6	Faafu Nilandhoo	16	4	1	11	20	60	−40	13	
7	Shaviyani Foakaidhoo	16	3	3	10	16	39	−23	12	
8	Victory (Note: Victory was docked 3 points for failing to pay over players' wages.)	16	2	4	10	10	36	−26	7	
9	Baa Fehendhoo	9	1	1	7	2	30	−28	4	Relegation play-offs
10	Thaa Thimarafushi	9	0	1	8	2	37	−35	1	Relegation play-offs

Source: FIFA
(C) Champions

== Fixtures and results ==
=== Round 1 ===
==== Week 1 ====
28 June 2018 1	New Radiant	10–0	Thimarafushi	National Football Stadium, Malé

29 June 2018 2	Club Eagles	3–2	Maziya	National Football Stadium, Malé

29 June 2018 3	TC Sports Club	6–1	Nilandhoo	National Football Stadium, Malé

30 June 2018 4	Green Streets	1–1	Foakaidhoo	National Football Stadium, Malé

30 June 2018 5	Victory	0–0	Fehendhoo	National Football Stadium, Malé

==== Week 2 ====
3 July 2018 6	Nilandhoo	0–7	Maziya	National Football Stadium, Malé

3 July 2018 7	New Radiant	2–2	Club Eagles	National Football Stadium, Malé

4 July 2018 8	Fehendhoo	3–0	TC Sports Club	National Football Stadium, Malé

4 July 2018 9	Thimarafushi	0–2	Green Streets	National Football Stadium, Malé

5 July 2018 10	Foakaidhoo	1–2	Victory	National Football Stadium, Malé

==== Week 3 ====
8 July 2018 11	Green Streets	2–0	Fehendhoo	National Football Stadium, Malé

9 July 2018 12	Thimarafushi	2–2	Foakaidhoo	National Football Stadium, Malé

9 July 2018 13	New Radiant	0–1	Maziya	National Football Stadium, Malé

10 July 2018 14	Club Eagles	0–1	TC Sports Club	National Football Stadium, Malé

10 July 2018 15	Victory	0–0	Nilandhoo	National Football Stadium, Malé

==== Week 4 ====
16 July 2018 16	Green Streets	6–0	Nilandhoo	National Football Stadium, Malé

16 July 2018 17	Thimarafushi	0–1	Fehendhoo	National Football Stadium, Malé

17 July 2018 18	Maziya	0–3	TC Sports Club	National Football Stadium, Malé

17 July 2018 19	New Radiant	1–0	Foakaidhoo	National Football Stadium, Malé

18 July 2018 20	Club Eagles	3–1	Victory	National Football Stadium, Malé

==== Week 5 ====
26 September 2018 21	Thimarafushi	0–3	Nilandhoo	National Football Stadium, Malé

26 September 2018 22	Maziya	5–0	Victory	National Football Stadium, Malé

27 September 2018 23	New Radiant	0–1	TC Sports Club	National Football Stadium, Malé

27 September 2018 24	Foakaidhoo	4–0	Fehendhoo	National Football Stadium, Malé

28 September 2018 25	Club Eagles	1–0	Green Streets	National Football Stadium, Malé

==== Week 6 ====
1 October 2018 26	New Radiant	11–0	Fehendhoo	National Football Stadium, Malé

2 October 2018 27	Foakaidhoo	2–0	Nilandhoo	National Football Stadium, Malé

2 October 2018 28	Club Eagles	9–0	Thimarafushi	National Football Stadium, Malé

3 October 2018 29	Maziya	4–1	Green Streets	National Football Stadium, Malé

3 October 2018 30	TC Sports Club	2–0 (awarded)	Victory	National Football Stadium, Malé
Note: Match forfeited as Victory DNS.

==== Week 7 ====
6 October 2018 31	Fehendhoo	1–3	Nilandhoo	National Football Stadium, Malé

6 October 2018 32	Club Eagles	5–0	Foakaidhoo	National Football Stadium, Malé

7 October 2018 33	Maziya	2–0	Thimarafushi	National Football Stadium, Malé

7 October 2018 34	TC Sports Club	1–2	Green Streets	National Football Stadium, Malé

8 October 2018 35	New Radiant	1–1	Victory	National Football Stadium, Malé

==== Week 8 ====
11 October 2018 36	Fehendhoo	0–5	Club Eagles	National Football Stadium, Malé

11 October 2018 37	Foakaidhoo	1–2	Maziya	National Football Stadium, Malé

12 October 2018 38	Green Streets	4–1	Victory	National Football Stadium, Malé

12 October 2018 39	Nilandhoo	0–1	New Radiant	National Football Stadium, Malé

13 October 2018 40	Thimarafushi	0–7	TC Sports Club	National Football Stadium, Malé

==== Week 9 ====
16 October 2018 41	Maziya	2–0	Fehendhoo	National Football Stadium, Malé

17 October 2018 42	Club Eagles	7–2	Nilandhoo	National Football Stadium, Malé

17 October 2018 43	New Radiant	2–2	Green Streets	National Football Stadium, Malé

18 October 2018 44	Victory	1–0	Thimarafushi	National Football Stadium, Malé

18 October 2018 45	TC Sports Club	4–0	Foakaidhoo	National Football Stadium, Malé

=== Round 2 ===
Top 8 teams from the first round continues from week 10.

==== Week 10 ====
21 October 2018 46	Maziya	4–2	Green Streets	National Football Stadium, Malé

21 October 2018 47	Club Eagles	8–0	Nilandhoo	National Football Stadium, Malé

22 October 2018 48	TC Sports Club	4–0	Victory	National Football Stadium, Malé

22 October 2018 49	New Radiant	2–0	Foakaidhoo	National Football Stadium, Malé

==== Week 11 ====
25 October 2018 50	Victory	0–0	Foakaidhoo	National Football Stadium, Malé

25 October 2018 51	TC Sports Club	2–0	New Radiant	National Football Stadium, Malé

26 October 2018 52	Green Streets	3–0	Nilandhoo	National Football Stadium, Malé

26 October 2018 53	Club Eagles	0–1	Maziya	National Football Stadium, Malé

==== Week 12 ====
29 October 2018 54	Club Eagles	7–0	Green Streets	National Football Stadium, Malé

29 October 2018 55	Maziya	6–1	Nilandhoo	National Football Stadium, Malé

30 October 2018 56	New Radiant	3–1	Victory	National Football Stadium, Malé

30 October 2018 57	TC Sports Club	5–1	Foakaidhoo	National Football Stadium, Malé

==== Week 13 ====
7 November 2018 58	New Radiant	5–2	Nilandhoo	National Football Stadium, Malé

7 November 2018 59	TC Sports Club	1–0	Green Streets	National Football Stadium, Malé

8 November 2018 60	Club Eagles	5–0	Foakaidhoo	National Football Stadium, Malé

8 November 2018 61	Maziya	3–0	Victory	National Football Stadium, Malé

==== Week 14 ====
21 November 2018 62	Club Eagles	2–0 (awarded)	Victory	National Football Stadium, Malé
Note: Match forfeited as Victory DNS.

21 November 2018 63	Maziya	5–0	Foakaidhoo	National Football Stadium, Malé

22 November 2018 64	TC Sports Club	7–0	Nilandhoo	National Football Stadium, Malé

22 November 2018 65	New Radiant	1–5	Green Streets	National Football Stadium, Malé

==== Week 15 ====
25 November 2018 66	TC Sports Club	2–4	Maziya	National Football Stadium, Malé

25 November 2018 67	Club Eagles	2–0	New Radiant	National Football Stadium, Malé

26 November 2018 68	Green Streets	1–4	Foakaidhoo	National Football Stadium, Malé

26 November 2018 69	Victory	1–4	Nilandhoo	National Football Stadium, Malé

==== Week 16 ====
29 November 2018 70	Foakaidhoo	0–4	Nilandhoo	National Football Stadium, Malé

29 November 2018 71	Green Streets	4–2	Victory	National Football Stadium, Malé

30 November 2018 72	Maziya	4–4	New Radiant	National Football Stadium, Malé

30 November 2018 73	TC Sports Club	4–4	Club Eagles	National Football Stadium, Malé
		Report

== Season statistics ==
As of 30 November 2018

=== Scoring ===
==== Top scorers ====
Rank	Player	Club	Goals
1	(Maldives) Ahmed Rizuvan	Eagles	31
2	(Maldives) Ali Ashfaq	TC Sports	22
3	(Maldives) Ali Fasir	New Radiant	15
3	(Ukraine) Roland Bilala	Green Streets	15
5	(Maldives) Asadhulla Abdulla	Maziya	14
6	(Saint Vincent and the Grenadines) Cornelius Stewart	Maziya	11
6	(Maldives) Mohamed Naim	Eagles	11
8	(Maldives) Ishan Ibrahim	TC Sports	8
8	(Maldives) Ibrahim Mahudhee	TC Sports	8
8	(Maldives) Naiz Hassan	Maziya	8
8	(Ghana) Adoku Kweku Lucas	Nilandhoo	8

==== Hat-tricks ====
Player	For	Against	Result	Date
(Maldives) Ali Fasir	New Radiant	Thimarafushi	10–0	28 June 2019
(Maldives) Hamza Mohamed	New Radiant	Thimarafushi	10–0	28 June 2019
(Maldives) Asadhulla Abdulla^{4}	Maziya	Nilandhoo	7–0	3 July 2019
(Maldives) Abdulla Misbaah	Green Streets	Nilandhoo	6–0	16 July 2019
(Maldives) Ismail Easa	Maziya	Victory	5–0	29 September 2019
(Maldives) Ali Fasir	New Radiant	Fehendhoo	11–0	1 October 2019
(Maldives) Ahmed Rizuvan^{4}	Eagles	Thimarafushi	9–0	2 October 2019
(Maldives) Naiz Hassan	Maziya	Green Streets	5–1	3 October 2019
(Maldives) Ahmed Rizuvan	Eagles	Foakaidhoo	5–0	6 October 2019
(Maldives) Ahmed Rizuvan^{5}	Eagles	Fehendhoo	5–0	11 October 2019
(Ukraine) Roland Bilala	Green Streets	Victory	4–1	12 October 2019
(Maldives) Ahmed Rizuvan	Eagles	Nilandhoo	7–2	17 October 2019
(Maldives) Ahmed Rizuvan	Eagles	Nilandhoo	8–0	21 October 2019
(Maldives) Mohamed Naim	Eagles	Nilandhoo	8–0	21 October 2019
(Maldives) Ali Ashfaq^{4}	TC Sports	Victory	4–0	22 October 2019
(Maldives) Ahmed Rizuvan^{4}	Eagles	Green Streets	7–0	29 October 2019
(Maldives) Asadhulla Abdulla	Maziya	Nilandhoo	6–1	29 October 2019
(Maldives) Mohamed Samir	TC Sports	Foakaidhoo	5–1	30 October 2019
(Maldives) Ahmed Rizuvan	Eagles	Foakaidhoo	5–0	8 November 2019
(Maldives) Asadhulla Abdulla	Maziya	Foakaidhoo	5–0	21 November 2019
(Maldives) Ali Ashfaq^{4}	TC Sports	Nilandhoo	7–0	22 November 2019
(Ukraine) Roland Bilala^{4}	Green Streets	New Radiant	5–1	22 November 2019
(Maldives) Ahmed Rizuvan	Eagles	TC Sports	4–4	30 November 2019

- ^{4} Player scored four goals
- ^{5} Player scored five goals
