= 2018 Malé League =

Malé League
- Season: 2018

The 2018 Malé League will be the eighth season of the Malé League, the top division of Maldivian football under the latest update of the Maldivian football league system. The league was made up of the 8 clubs.

== Format ==
All eight teams play against each other in Two Round Format. Team with most total points at the end of the season will be crowned as Malé League champion. Top six teams qualify for the Dhivehi Premier League. Bottom two teams play the Malé League qualification with the runner-up of Second Division.

The team with the most points in Malé League qualification after a two-legged group round will play in the next year's Malé League. Bottom two will be relegated to Second Division.

== Teams ==
A total of 8 teams will be contesting in the league.

=== Teams and their divisions ===
Note: Table lists clubs in alphabetical order.

Team	Division
Eagles	Maafannu
Club Green Streets	Machchangolhi
Valencia	Machchangolhi
Maziya	West Maafannu
New Radiant	Henveiru
TC Sports Club	Henveiru
United Victory	Galolhu
Victory	Galolhu

=== Personnel ===
Note: Flags indicate national team as has been defined under FIFA eligibility rules. Players may hold more than one non-FIFA nationality.

Team	Head coach	Captain
Eagles	(Maldives) Mohamed Shiyaz	(Sri Lanka) Sujan Perera
Green Streets	(Maldives) Ali Suzain	(Maldives) Ashad Ali
Valencia	(Maldives) Sobah Mohamed	(Maldives) Mohamed Sifan
Maziya	(Maldives) Ismail Mahfooz	(Maldives) Asadhulla Abdulla
New Radiant	(Spain) Óscar Bruzón	(Maldives) Ali Ashfaq
TC Sports Club	(Maldives) Mohamed Nizam	(Maldives) Farrah Ahmed
United Victory	(Maldives) Mohamed Nazeeh	(Maldives) Hussain Shimaz
Victory	(Hungary) László Kiss	(Maldives) Shafiu Ahmed

== Foreign players ==
Players name in bold indicates the player is registered during the mid-season transfer window.

Club	Visa 1	Visa 2	Visa 3	Visa 4 (Asian)	Former Players
Club Eagles	(Brazil) Luiz Eduardo Purcino	(Egypt) Mahmoud Sayed		(Sri Lanka) Sujan Perera	
Club Green Streets	(Ukraine) Ilya Sobol	(Ukraine) Roland Bilala	(Ukraine) Oleh Yefimchuk	(Uzbekistan) Sergey Smorodin	
Club Valencia	Dryga Sergi	Heysham Valeri	(Japan) Jun Kochi	(Kyrgyzstan) Aidar Mambetaliev	
Maziya	(Serbia) Miloš Kovačević	(Italy) Mauro Boerchio	(Saint Vincent and the Grenadines) Cornelius Stewart		
New Radiant	(Spain) Candela	(Spain) Jorge Gotor	(Spain) Guillem Martí Misut	(Afghanistan) Zohib Islam Amiri	
TC Sports Club	(Egypt) Alaaeldin Nasr	(Liberia) Dioh Williams		(Kyrgyzstan) Anatoliy Vlasichev	
United Victory	(Brazil) Rafael Betim Marti	(Brazil) Paulo Helber	(Trinidad and Tobago) Kordell Samuel	(Kyrgyzstan) Artur Muladzhanov	
Victory	(Spain) Ángel Carrascosa Muñoz	(Hungary) Simon Tibor Csordás	(Spain) Joaco Cañas		

== League table ==
Pos	Team	Pld	W	D	L	GF	GA	GD	Pts	Qualification or relegation
1	New Radiant	14	12	1	1	40	10	+30	37	2018 Dhivehi Premier League
2	Eagles	14	7	4	3	32	22	+10	25	2018 Dhivehi Premier League
3	Maziya	14	7	3	4	26	12	+14	24	2018 Dhivehi Premier League
4	TC Sports Club	14	5	5	4	24	20	+4	20	2018 Dhivehi Premier League
5	Victory	14	6	2	6	21	24	−3	20	2018 Dhivehi Premier League
6	Green Streets	14	3	5	6	28	31	−3	14	2018 Dhivehi Premier League
7	United Victory	14	2	3	9	15	33	−18	9	Malé League qualification
8	Valencia	14	2	1	11	11	45	−34	7	Malé League qualification

== Season summary ==
=== Round One and Two ===
Home \ Away	EAG	GRS	VLC	MAZ	NRA	TCS	UVI	VIC
Eagles		2–1	6–1	0–2	2–2	0–0	2–2	2–1
Green Streets				2–2	1–6	2–2	1–1	1–2
Valencia	3–3	0–5		0–2	0–2	0–3		1–3
Maziya	0–1	2–2	5–0		0–1	2–2	4–0	1–0
New Radiant	4–1	4–1	5–0			2–0	4–1	1–2
TC Sports	3–2	3–4	4–0	2–0	0–3		2–1	
United Victory	2–4	0–5	3–0	0–2	0–1	1–1		2–1
Victory	1–4	2–2	2–1	0–3	1–3	2–0	3–1	

Updated to match(es) played on 03 June 2018. Source:
Legend: Blue = home team win; Yellow = draw; Red = away team win.

Note 1: The notion of home and away fixtures in the 2018 Malé League is moot as all games are played at National Football Stadium. As such, for the purpose of this table, the first result chronologically has been deemed that team's "home" game and the second the "away" game.

=== Positions by round ===
The table lists the positions of teams after each week of matches.

Team ╲ Round	1	2	3	4	5	6	7	8	9	10	11	12	13	14
Eagles														
Green Streets														
Valencia														
Maziya														
New Radiant														
TC Sports														
United Victory														
Victory														

Updated to match(es) played on 26 February 2018. Source:

=== Matches ===
==== First round ====
A total of 28 matches will be played in this round.

==== Second round ====
A total of 28 matches will be played in this round.

== Season statistics ==
20 April 2018
20:00
Second leg

Victory	2–1	New Radiant
52', 61' Ibrahim Hamdhaan		Gallardo 16'

National Football Stadium, Malé
Male' League 2018
4 June 2018
20:00
16

Victory	1–2	Eagles
81' Ibrahim Hamdhaan		Sameeh 55', 5'

National Football Stadium, Malé

== 2019 Malé League qualification ==
The qualifiers were to be played between 2018 Malé League bottom two teams– United Victory and Club Valencia, and 2018 Second Division runner up JJ Sports Club. Due to unknown reasons, JJ Sports Club withdrew their chance in the qualification phase.

26 June 2018
16:00
First leg

United Victory	2–0	Club Valencia
Ali Haishan 18'; Rafael Betim Marti 88'	Report

National Football Stadium, Malé

1 July 2018
16:00
Second leg

Club Valencia	2–2	United Victory
Mohamed Sifan (?); Ansar Ibrahim 18'	Report	30' Kordell Samuel (?) Rafael Betim Marti

National Football Stadium, Malé
- United Victory won 4–2 on aggregate and secured their first division spot for next season.
- Club Valencia relegated for the first time in the 39-year history of the club.
