= 2019–20 in Maldivian football =

Football in Maldives
- Season: 2019–20

Men's football
- Premier League: Maziya
- Second Division: Club Valencia
- FA Cup: not awarded
- President's Cup: cancelled
- Charity Shield: TC Sports Club

Overview of the 2019–20 season of association football in the Maldives. The season was abandoned on 15 March 2020, due to the COVID-19 pandemic in the Maldives. It was declared void on 30 March 2020.

== National teams ==
=== Maldives national football team ===
==== Results and fixtures ====
===== Friendlies =====
5 November 2019	Malaysia	2–1^{1}	Maldives	Paroi, Malaysia
20:45 UTC+8	Syahmi Safari 8'; Baddrol Bakhtiar 72'	Report	Ahmed Rizuvan 60'	Stadium: Tuanku Abdul Rahman Stadium

- ^{1} Non-FIFA 'A' international match

===== 2019 Indian Ocean Island Games =====
====== Group B ======
Pos	Team	Pld	W	D	L	GF	GA	GD	Pts	Qualification
1	Réunion	3	2	0	1	5	1	+4	6	Advance to knockout stage
2	Mayotte	3	2	0	1	5	2	+3	6	Advance to knockout stage
3	Comoros	3	2	0	1	4	2	+2	6	
4	Maldives	3	0	0	3	1	10	−9	0	

Source: IOCS

18 July 2019	Réunion	4–0	Maldives	Centre de Flacq, Mauritius
		Report		Stadium: Stade Auguste Vollaire

20 July 2019	Comoros	3–0	Maldives	Curepipe, Mauritius
		Report		Stadium: Stade George V

22 July 2019	Mayotte	3–1	Maldives	Centre de Flacq, Mauritius
		Report		Stadium: Stade Auguste Vollaire

===== 2022 FIFA World Cup qualification – AFC second round =====
====== Group A ======
Pos	Team	Pld	W	D	L	GF	GA	GD	Pts	Qualification	(Syria)	(China)	(Philippines)	(Maldives)	(Guam)
1	Syria	5	5	0	0	14	4	+10	15	Third round and Asian Cup	—	2–1	1–0	2–1	4–0
2	China	4	2	1	1	13	2	+11	7	Third round and Asian Cup or Asian Cup qualifying third round (Note: The four best runners-up across all groups will advance to the World Cup qualifying third round and Asian Cup. The remaining four runners-up will advance to the Asian Cup qualifying third round)	MD10	—	MD9	MD7	7–0
3	Philippines	5	2	1	2	8	8	0	7	Asian Cup qualifying third round	2–5	0–0	—	MD10	MD7
4	Maldives	5	2	0	3	6	10	−4	6	Asian Cup qualifying third round or play-off round (Note: The four best fourth-placed teams across all groups will advance to the Asian Cup qualifying third round. The remaining four fourth-placed teams will advance to the Asian Cup qualifying play-off round.)	MD8	0–5	1–2	—	3–1
5	Guam (Z)	5	0	0	5	2	19	−17	0	Asian Cup qualifying play-off round	MD9	MD8	1–4	0–1	—

Updated to match(es) played on 19 November 2019. Source: AFC
Rules for classification: Qualification tiebreakers
(Z) Eliminated from the World Cup
Notes:

5 September 2019	Guam	0–1	Maldives	Dededo, Guam
15:30 UTC+10		Report (FIFA); Report (AFC)	Mahudhee 27'	Stadium: Guam F.A. National Training Center; Attendance: 714; Referee: Yaqoub Al-Hammadi (United Arab Emirates)

10 September 2019	Maldives	0–5	China	Malé, Maldives
16:00 UTC+5		Report (FIFA); Report (AFC)	Wu Xi 33'; Wu Lei 45'; Yang Xu 64' (pen.); Elkeson 83' (pen.), 90+1'	Stadium: National Football Stadium; Attendance: 3,700; Referee: Turki Al-Khudhayr (Saudi Arabia)

10 October 2019	Syria	2–1	Maldives	Dubai, United Arab Emirates
18:00 UTC+4	Al Somah 26', 60'	Report (FIFA); Report (AFC)	Ashfaq 70'	Stadium: Rashid Stadium; Attendance: 5,500; Referee: Nazmi Nasaruddin (Malaysia)

14 November 2019	Maldives	1–2	Philippines	Malé, Maldives
16:00 UTC+5	Hassan 90+3'	Report (FIFA); Report (AFC)	Ramsay 52'; Strauß 68'	Stadium: National Football Stadium; Referee: Ahmed Al-Ali (Jordan)

19 November 2019	Maldives	3–1	Guam	Malé, Maldives
16:00 UTC+5	Samooh 23'; Nicklaw 38' (o.g.); Ashfaq 90+1'	Report (FIFA); Report (AFC)	Matkin 49'	Stadium: National Football Stadium; Referee: Hussein Abo Yehia (Lebanon)

2021 (Note: Both FIFA and the AFC have agreed to the postponement of upcoming matches in the Asian 2022 World Cup and 2023 Asian Cup qualifiers because of the COVID-19 pandemic in Asia, although some matches may still be able to be played after mutual consent from the relative member federations, plus FIFA and the AFC. On 5 June 2020, AFC confirmed that Matchdays 7 and 8 were scheduled to take place on 8 and 13 October respectively while Matchdays 9 and 10 were scheduled to kick off on 12 and 17 November. On 12 August 2020, AFC announced that the upcoming qualifying matches for the World Cup and Asian Cup, originally scheduled to take place during the international match windows in October and November 2020, will be rescheduled to 2021.)	China	v	Maldives	TBD, China
--:-- UTC+8

2021	Maldives	v	Syria	Malé, Maldives
--:-- UTC+5				Stadium: National Football Stadium

2021	Philippines	v	Maldives	Bacolod, Philippines
--:-- UTC+8				Stadium: Panaad Stadium

=== Maldives U-23 national football team ===
==== 2020 AFC U-23 Championship qualification ====
===== Group D =====
Pos	Team	Pld	W	D	L	GF	GA	GD	Pts	Qualification
1	United Arab Emirates	3	2	1	0	10	2	+8	7	Final tournament
2	Saudi Arabia (H)	3	2	1	0	9	1	+8	7	Final tournament
3	Lebanon	3	1	0	2	7	8	−1	3	
4	Maldives	3	0	0	3	0	15	−15	0	

Source: AFC
Rules for classification: Qualification tiebreakers
(H) Hosts

22 March 2019	Saudi Arabia	6–0	Maldives	Prince Faisal bin Fahd Stadium, Riyadh
20:25	A. Al-Yami 26'; Al-Hamdan 27', 67', 73'; Ghareeb 49'; Al-Khulaif 78'	Report		Attendance: 122; Referee: Takuto Okabe (Japan)

24 March 2019	Maldives	0–3	United Arab Emirates	Prince Faisal bin Fahd Stadium, Riyadh
17:25		Report	M. Al-Hammadi 29'; Z. Al-Ameri 49'; Shaker 76'	Attendance: 28; Referee: Zhang Lei (China)

26 March 2019	Lebanon	6–0	Maldives	Prince Faisal bin Fahd Stadium, Riyadh
17:25	Kdouh 24'; Darwiche 26'; Mehanna 59'; Monzer 62'; Y. Al Haj 75'; Boutros 82'	Report		Attendance: 130; Referee: Zhang Lei (China)

==== 2019 South Asian Games ====
===== Round Robin stage =====
Pos	Team	Pld	W	D	L	GF	GA	GD	Pts	Qualification
1	Nepal (H)	4	3	1	0	8	2	+6	10	Advance to Final
2	Bhutan	4	3	0	1	6	5	+1	9	Advance to Final
3	Bangladesh	4	1	1	2	2	3	−1	4	
4	Maldives	4	0	2	2	3	5	−2	2	
5	Sri Lanka	4	0	2	2	1	5	−4	2	

Source: 2019 SAG Unogoal
Rules for classification: 1) points; 2) goal difference; 3) goals scored; 4) head-to-head result.
(H) Hosts

2 December 2019	Sri Lanka	0−0	Maldives	Dasarath Rangasala Stadium, Kathmandu
17:00		Report		Attendance: 500; Referee: Shrawan Lama (Nepal)

3 December 2019	Maldives	1−1	Bangladesh	Dasarath Rangasala Stadium, Kathmandu
17:30	Hossain 70'	Report	A. Ghanee 30' (o.g.)	Attendance: 450; Referee: Kabin Byanjankar (Nepal)

5 December 2019	Bhutan	2−1	Maldives	Dasarath Rangasala Stadium, Kathmandu
13:30	C. Dorji 55'; Thinley 84'	Report	H. Mohamad 90'	Attendance: 200; Referee: MD Mizanur Rahman (Bangladesh)

7 December 2019	Nepal	2−1	Maldives	Dasarath Rangasala Stadium, Kathmandu
13:30	Rijal 43'; A. Tamang 52'	Report	Mahudhee 18'	Attendance: 20,000; Referee: MD Mizanur Rahman (Bangladesh)

=== Maldives U-19 national football team ===
==== 2020 AFC U-19 Championship qualification ====
===== Group C =====
Pos	Team	Pld	W	D	L	GF	GA	GD	Pts	Qualification
1	Tajikistan (H)	3	3	0	0	11	0	+11	9	Final tournament
2	Lebanon	3	1	1	1	3	2	+1	4	
3	Syria	3	1	1	1	4	4	0	4	
4	Maldives	3	0	0	3	2	14	−12	0	

Source: AFC
Rules for classification: Qualification tiebreakers
(H) Hosts

2 October 2019	Tajikistan	9–0	Maldives	Republican Central Stadium, Dushanbe
19:00	Rahmatov 4', 88'; Safarov 9'; Samiyev 13', 21', 46'; Zairov 36', 42'; Dhaisam 76' (o.g.)	Report		Attendance: 2,920; Referee: Chen Hsin-chuan (Chinese Taipei)

4 October 2019	Maldives	2–3	Syria	Republican Central Stadium, Dushanbe
16:00	S. Ibrahim 19'; Nazeem 55'	Report	S. Ibrahim 25' (o.g.); Al-Malhem 33'; Ramadan 62'	Attendance: 400; Referee: Ali Shaban (Kuwait)

6 October 2019	Lebanon	2–0	Maldives	Republican Central Stadium, Dushanbe
16:00	Hijazi 19'; Dakramanji 76'	Report		Attendance: 60; Referee: Chen Hsin-chuan (Chinese Taipei)

=== Maldives U-18 national football team ===
==== 2019 SAFF U-18 Championship ====
===== Group A =====
Pos	Team	Pld	W	D	L	GF	GA	GD	Pts	Status
1	Bhutan	2	1	1	0	3	0	+3	4	Qualified for Knockout stage
2	Maldives	2	0	2	0	1	1	0	2	Qualified for Knockout stage
3	Nepal	2	0	1	1	1	4	−3	1	

Updated to match(es) played on 24 September 2019. Source: SAFF

20 September 2019	Nepal	1−1	Maldives	APF Stadium, Kathmandu
15:00	Dangi 75'	Report	Nazeem 12'	Attendance: 1,000; Referee: Mohamed Anisur Rahman (Bangladesh)

24 September 2019	Maldives	0−0	Bhutan	APF Stadium, Kathmandu
15:30		Report		Attendance: 150; Referee: Ashantha Dias Ponhen Adeege (Sri Lanka)

===== Semi-final =====
27 September 2019	India	4−0	Maldives	APF Stadium, Kathmandu
15:00	Gahlot 7'; Rasheedh 45+1' (o.g.); M. Singh 79'; Meetei 81'	Report		Attendance: 350; Referee: Kabin Byanjankar (Nepal)

===== Third place match =====
29 September 2019	Bhutan	0−1	Maldives	APF Stadium, Kathmandu
10:30		Report	Imran 75'	Attendance: 150; Referee: Anisur Rahman (Bangladesh)

=== Maldives U-16 national football team ===
==== 2020 AFC U-16 Championship qualification ====
===== Group C =====
Pos	Team	Pld	W	D	L	GF	GA	GD	Pts	Qualification
1	Iran (H)	3	3	0	0	18	1	+17	9	Final tournament
2	Palestine	3	2	0	1	8	3	+5	6	
3	Maldives	3	1	0	2	4	17	−13	3	
4	Afghanistan	3	0	0	3	0	9	−9	0	

Source: AFC
Rules for classification: Qualification tiebreakers
(H) Hosts

18 September 2019	Iran	13–0	Maldives	Hajibabaei Stadium, Hamadan
19:45	Ebrahimzadeh 6', 27', 46', 77', 86'; Rostami 11' (pen.), 48'; Danesh 26', 43'; Bahri 30', 40'; Kooshki 58', 72'	Report		Attendance: 1,221; Referee: Yusuke Araki (Japan)

20 September 2019	Maldives	3–0; Awarded^{2}	Afghanistan	Hajibabaei Stadium, Hamadan
16:45		Report	Amin 52'; Bashiri 57'; Halim 84'	Attendance: 420; Referee: Khalid Al-Shaqsi (Oman)

22 September 2019	Palestine	4–1	Maldives	Hajibabaei Stadium, Hamadan
15:45	Al-Sharbati 56'; Khdirat 66'; Awayssa 88'; Attal 90+2'	Report	Hamdoon 50'	Attendance: 144; Referee: Mongkolchai Pechsri (Thailand)

- ^{2} AFC awarded Palestine, Maldives and Iran a 3–0 win as a result of Afghanistan fielding two ineligible players. The original match results were Afghanistan 2–2 Palestine, Maldives 0–3 Afghanistan and Iran 4–0 Afghanistan.

=== Maldives U-15 national football team ===
==== 2019 UEFA ASSIST U-15 International Tournament ====
===== Round Robin stage =====
Team	Pld	W	D	L	GF	GA	GD	Pts
Latvia	3	3	0	0	15	4	+11	9
Bhutan	3	2	0	1	7	7	0	6
Saudi Arabia	3	1	0	2	8	6	+2	3
Maldives	3	0	0	3	1	14	−13	0

Updated to match(es) played on 27 July 2019. Source: FAM

20 July 2019	Bhutan	2–1	Maldives	Addu Football Stadium, Addu City
16:00	Jugme Namgyel 6'; Bikash Pradhan 25'		68' Mohamed Khanaan Adam	Referee: Abdulla Shathir (Maldives)

23 July 2019	Maldives	0–6	Saudi Arabia	Addu Football Stadium, Addu City
16:00			14' Awad Abdu Dahal; 34' Mohammed Abdullah Alamri; 37' Abdulsalam Ali Barnawi; 40', 45+3' Ahmed Ali Asiri; 43' Bader Waleed Alharbi

27 July 2019	Maldives	0–6	Latvia	Addu Football Stadium, Addu City
16:00			10', 12' Valerijs Lizunovs; 33', 74' Markuss Marksimuss Alpens; 61', 81', 90+1' Kristaps Puzanovs	Referee: Zaheer Hussain (Maldives)

=== Maldives women's national football team ===
==== Results and fixtures ====
===== Friendlies =====
March 2019	United Arab Emirates	2–0	Maldives	United Arab Emirates
		Report

March 2019	United Arab Emirates	1–1	Maldives	United Arab Emirates
		Report	Rifa ??'

November 2019	United Arab Emirates	0–0	Maldives	United Arab Emirates
		Report

===== 2019 SAFF Women's Championship =====
====== Group B ======
Pos	Team	Pld	W	D	L	GF	GA	GD	Pts	Status
1	India	2	2	0	0	11	0	+11	6	Qualified for Knockout stage
2	Sri Lanka	2	1	0	1	2	5	−3	3	Qualified for Knockout stage
3	Maldives	2	0	0	2	0	8	−8	0	

Updated to match(es) played on 17 March 2019. Source: SAFF

13 March 2019	India	6–0	Maldives	Sahid Rangsala, Biratnagar
15:00	Sanju 27', 89'; Grace 8'; Sweety 13'; Indumathi 23'; Ratanbala 45+4'	SAFF AIFF		Attendance: 1,813; Referee: Ashmita Manandhar (Nepal)

15 March 2019	Maldives	0–2	Sri Lanka	Sahid Rangsala, Biratnagar
15:00		SAFF ANFA	Chalini 40', 50'	Attendance: 1,464; Referee: Dulal Mridha (Bangladesh)

===== 2019 South Asian Games =====
====== Round Robin stage ======
Pos	Team	Pld	W	D	L	GF	GA	GD	Pts	Qualification
1	India (C)	4	4	0	0	14	0	+14	12	Advance to Final
2	Nepal	4	2	0	2	4	3	+1	6	Advance to Final
3	Maldives	3	1	0	2	2	9	−7	3	Bronze Medal
4	Sri Lanka	3	0	0	3	1	8	−7	0	

Updated to match(es) played on 9 December 2019. Source: Futbol24
Rules for classification: 1) points; 2) goal difference; 3) goals scored; 4) head-to-head result .
(C) Champions

3 December 2019	India	5−0	Maldives	Pokhara, Nepal
	Grace 5'; B. Devi 24', 33'; Kalyan 87'; Tudu 88'	Report		Stadium: Pokhara Rangasala; Attendance: 150

5 December 2019	Maldives	0−3	Nepal	Pokhara, Nepal
		Report	Bhandari 20', 25', 90+1'	Stadium: Pokhara Rangasala; Attendance: 600

7 December 2019	Maldives	2−1	Sri Lanka	Pokhara, Nepal
	S. Aminath 37'; F. Saina 54'	Report	C. Ekanayake 85'	Stadium: Pokhara Rangasala; Attendance: 200

== AFC competitions ==
=== AFC Cup ===
==== Qualifying play-offs ====
===== Preliminary round 2 =====
South Asia Zone
Team 1	Agg.	Team 2	1st leg	2nd leg
Abahani Limited Dhaka (Bangladesh)	2–2 (a)	(Maldives) Maziya	2–2	0–0

===== Play-off round =====
South Asia Zone
Team 1	Agg.	Team 2	1st leg	2nd leg
Maziya (Maldives)	4–4 (4–3 p)	(India) Bengaluru	2–1	2–3 (a.e.t.)

==== Group stage ====
===== Group E =====
Pos	Team	Pld	W	D	L	GF	GA	GD	Pts	BAS	MAZ	CHE	TCS
1	(Bangladesh) Bashundhara Kings	1	1	0	0	5	1	+4	3	—	~~4 Nov~~	~~29 Oct~~	5–1
2	(Maldives) Maziya	1	0	1	0	2	2	0	1 (Note: Head-to-head away goals: Maziya 2, Chennai City 0.)	~~23 Oct~~	—	~~1 Nov~~	~~26 Oct~~
3	(India) Chennai City	1	0	1	0	2	2	0	1	~~26 Oct~~	2–2	—	~~4 Nov~~
4	(Maldives) TC Sports	1	0	0	1	1	5	−4	0	~~1 Nov~~	~~29 Oct~~	~~23 Oct~~	—

Source: AFC

== International club competitions ==
=== Sheikh Kamal International Club Cup ===
==== Group A ====
Pos	Team	Pld	W	D	L	GF	GA	GD	Pts	Qualification
1	(Bangladesh) Chittagong Abahani (H)	3	2	0	1	8	3	+5	6	Advance to Semi-finals
2	(India) Mohun Bagan AC	3	2	0	1	4	2	+2	6	Advance to Semi-finals
3	(Laos) Young Elephant F.C.	3	2	0	1	6	6	0	6	
4	(Maldives) TC Sports Club	3	0	0	3	2	8	−6	0	

Source: GSA
(H) Hosts

== Men's football ==
=== Premier League ===
Pos	Team	Pld	W	D	L	GF	GA	GD	Pts	Qualification or relegation (Note: Top six teams continue after each team have played 16 matches.)
1	Maziya (C)	21	16	3	2	74	12	+62	51	Qualification for 2021 AFC Cup group stage
2	Eagles (Note: Due to the COVID-19 pandemic in the Maldives, the 2020 Maldives FA Cup was cancelled and declared null and void by the Football Association of Maldives. As a result, the 2019–20 Dhivehi Premier League runner-ups qualified for AFC Cup qualifying play-offs.)	21	13	6	2	56	25	+31	45	Qualification for 2021 AFC Cup preliminary round 2
3	TC Sports	21	12	5	4	42	21	+21	41	
4	Green Streets	21	8	5	8	45	41	+4	29	
5	Da Grande	21	7	6	8	33	32	+1	27	
6	Foakaidhoo	21	5	5	11	20	45	−25	20	
7	United Victory	16	4	4	8	26	41	−15	16	
8	Nilandhoo	16	4	2	10	24	54	−30	14	
9	Victory (Note: Victory were excluded after multiple forfeits, all remaining matches were awarded 0–2 losses against them.) (R)	16	0	0	16	1	50	−49	0	Relegation to Maldivian Second Division

Source: Dhivehi Premier League
Rules for classification: 1) Points; 2) Head-to-head points; 3) Head-to-head goal difference; 4) Head-to-head goals scored; 5) Goal difference; 6) Goals scored.
(C) Champions; (R) Relegated

=== Second Division ===
Pos	Team	Pld	W	D	L	GF	GA	GD	Pts	Final result
1	Club Valencia (C, Q)	5	4	1	0	13	6	+7	13	Champions & Promoted to 2020–21 Dhivehi Premier League
2	Super United Sports (Q)	6	4	1	1	12	8	+4	13	Runners-up & Promoted for 2020–21 Dhivehi Premier League
3	JJ Sports	5	3	0	2	14	9	+5	9	Semi finalists
4	Club PK	4	2	0	2	5	5	0	6	Semi finalists
5	Dhivehi Sifainge Club	4	2	0	2	6	6	0	6	Eliminated in Group stage
6	Mahibadhoo	4	1	1	2	7	11	−4	4	Eliminated in Group stage
7	Kuda Henveiru	3	0	2	1	3	4	−1	2	Eliminated in Group stage
8	BG Sports	3	0	1	2	2	6	−4	1	Eliminated in Group stage
9	Maldives U19	4	0	0	4	1	8	−7	0	Eliminated in Group stage

(C) Champions; (Q) Qualified for the phase indicated

Per statistical convention in football, matches decided in extra time are counted as wins and losses, while matches decided by penalty shoot-out are counted as draws.

=== Jazeera Championship ===
Minivan Championship was re-branded to Jazeera Championship on 30 September 2019. On 9 October 2019, Football Association of Maldives announced that the first tournament under the current format will be held on January 25, 2020.

=== Cup competitions ===
==== Charity Shield ====
===== First leg =====
7 June 2019
16:00 UTC+05:00

Foakaidhoo	1–1	TC Sports Club
H. Fazeel 88' (pen.)	Report	65' Easa

Foakaidhoo Football Ground, Foakaidhoo
Referee: TBA (Maldives)

===== Second leg =====
11 June 2019
21:00 UTC+05:00

TC Sports Club	3–1	Foakaidhoo
Aisam 26'; Bimal 69', 77'	Report	58' Shaamiu

National Football Stadium, Malé
Referee: Adam Fazeel (Maldives)

==== FAM Youth Championship ====
===== Final =====
19 February 2019
20:30

TC Sports Club U21s	0–1	Club Eagles U21s
	Report	33' Mohamed Azumoon

National Football Stadium, Malé
Referee: Abdulla Shathir (Maldives)
