= Buru Sports Club =

Buru
- Full name: Buru Sports Club
- Nickname: The Conquerors
- Short name: Buru
- Founded: 6 October 2008; 18 years ago
- Ground: National Football Stadium, Malé
- Capacity: 11,850
- Head coach: Cristian Rodriguez
- League: Dhivehi Premier League
- 2025-26: DPL, 4th of 10
Home colours	Away colours

Buru Sports Club is a Maldivian professional football club based in Machchangolhi in the city of Malé.

== Club history ==
Founded in 2008, the club has participated in numerous sports, including the Bashi Tournament, Baibalaa, football, and handball. The club's journey has seen it rise from the 2nd division to claim the top spot in the 1st division of football.Buru gained their promotion in, winning the 2021 Third Division. They earned back to back promotion and reached the top tier of Maldives, winning the 2022 Second Division and securing second in the 2023 Dhivehi Premier League play-off.

=== Achievements ===
The club has a history of success in various competitions:

Champions in Baibalaa: 2007, 2018, and reigning champions in the Baibalaa 1445 tournament in 2024. Promoted from the 2nd division to the 1st division in football, achieving top honors.from the 2nd division to claim the top spot in the 1st division of football.Buru gained their promotion in, winning the 2021 Third Division. They earned back to back promotion and reached the top tier of Maldives, winning the 2022 Second Division and securing second in the 2023 Dhivehi Premier League play-off

== Seasons ==
=== Domestic ===
Season	League									FA Cup	President's Cup	Top goalscorer		Manager
Season	Div.	Pos.	Pl.	W	D	L	GS	GA	P	FA Cup	President's Cup	Player	Goals	Manager
2023	1st	5th	14	6	0	8	18	-8	18	Cancelled	-			(Maldives) Mohamed Nizam
2025-26	1st	4th	18	8	5	5	40	25	29	Semi Final	Semi Final	(Maldives) Mohamed Naim	12 goals	(Maldives) Mohamed Nizam

== Honours ==
=== League ===
- Second Division
  - Winners: 2022
- Third Division
  - Winners: 2021

== Current squad ==
As of September 2026

Note: Flags indicate national team as defined under FIFA eligibility rules; some limited exceptions apply. Players may hold more than one non-FIFA nationality.

No.	Pos.	Nation	Player
1	GK	MDV	Hassan Aleef
2	DF	COL	Harold Reyes
3	DF	ESP	Albert Freixa
4	DF	MDV	Thoif Gasim
5	DF	MDV	Mohamed Naisam
6	DF	MDV	Affan Bin Ahmed
7	FW	MDV	Yaameen
9	FW	ARG	Juan Lescano
10	MF	MDV	Hassan Gais Mohamed
11	FW	MDV	Areen Abdulla
12	MF	EGY	Khalil Gamal
13	MF	MDV	Abdulla Nauhan
14	DF	MDV	Mohamed Nazaam

No.	Pos.	Nation	Player
15	FW	MDV	Arham Amjad
16	DF	MDV	Makeen Mohamed
17	DF	MDV	Ibrahim Naaish
18	GK	MDV	Ali Najih
19	DF	MDV	Ibrahim Usamaa
20	MF	MDV	Mohamed Joodh Ismail
21	MF	MDV	Mohamed Hamdhoon
22	DF	MDV	Moosa Azeem Hassan
23	MF	MDV	Ali Hamdhaan (captain)
24	DF	MDV	Hussain Luhaam Nadeem
25	GK	MDV	Shaihan Ali
26	DF	MDV	Mohamed Sameeh
27	DF	MDV	Shamveel Mohamed
29	GK	MDV	Ahmed Rameez
30	DF	MDV	Mohamed Leevaan Nadheem
31	GK	MDV	Moosa Ayyan Hussain
32	GK	MDV	Abdul Hishan
33	GK	MDV	Yoosuf Shahid
35	GK	MDV	Mohamed Rayyan
