= Mohamed Naim =

Maldivian footballer

Personal information
- Full name: Mohamed Naim
- Date of birth: 7 October 1996 (age 30)
- Place of birth: Guraidhoo, Kaafu Atoll, Maldives
- Positions: Forward; attacking midfielder

Team information
- Current team: Buru Sports Club
- Number: 10

Youth career
- 2017: Club Eagles

Senior career*
Years	Team	Apps	(Gls)
2015–2016	K. Guraidhoo		
2017–2022	Club Eagles		
2023–	Buru Sports Club		

International career
2018–	Maldives	6	(0)
- * Club domestic league appearances and goals

Mohamed Naim (born 7 October 1996) is a Maldivian professional footballer who plays as a forward, attacking midfielder or winger for Buru Sports Club and Maldives national team.

== Club career ==
Naim played in the Minivan Championship for his island team K. Guraidhoo, before joining Club Eagles in 2017. On 7 May 2017, he scored his first senior goal for Club Eagles against New Radiant. It was the only goal in the match where Eagles won 1–0 in 2017 Malé League. He was also included in the Club Eagles U21 squad for the 2017 season and appeared in 2017 FAM Youth Championship, where his side won the championship for third consecutive time. He was included in the tournament's best 3 players.

On 16 October 2019, Naim tore his ACL during the Dhivehi Premier League win against Maziya, forcing him to sit on sidelines for 6 months.

Naim joined Buru Sports Club 2023.

== International career ==
On 23 March 2018, Naim made his debut for the Maldives national team along with his elder brother Ahmed Numaan, at the National Stadium, Singapore, as an 80th-minute substitute for Hamza Mohamed in a friendly game where they lost 3–2 to Singapore. Naim traveled to India for the 2018 SAFF Championship with the Maldives team as a standby player with Abdulla Yaameen, but did not make it to the final 20-men by Croatian coach Petar Segrt.

Naim played in the 2019 Indian Ocean Island Games, and scored in the 3–1 loss against Mayotte in the last group stage game.

On 5 September 2019, Naim made his full debut for the national team in the 2022 FIFA World Cup qualification match against Guam at Dededo, where they won 1–0.

== Personal life ==
Naim was born in Guraidhoo, Kaafu Atoll, on 7 October 1996. He has an elder brother, Ahmed Numaan, who is also a professional footballer and has represented Club Eagles and the Maldives national team.

== Honours ==
Club Eagles U21

- FAM Youth Championship: 2017
