= 2014 Maldives FA Cup final =

- Event: 2014 Maldives FA Cup
New Radiant	Maziya
0	0
- Maziya won 4–3 on penalties
- Date: 19 November 2014
- Venue: National Football Stadium, Malé

The 2014 Maldives FA Cup final is the 27th Final of the Maldives FA Cup.

== Route to the final ==
New Radiant
QF	New Radiant	6–3	Mahibadhoo
SF	New Radiant	1–0	Eagles

Maziya
QF	Maziya	3–1	TC Sports Club
SF	Valencia	0–2	Maziya

== Match ==
=== Details ===
19 November 2014
21:00 UTC+5

New Radiant SC	0 – 0 (a.e.t.)	Maziya S&RC
	Report
Penalties
Fazeel (penalty scored); Akram (penalty scored); Abdulla (penalty missed); Niyaz (penalty missed); Umair (penalty scored)	3 – 4	(penalty scored) Arif; (penalty missed) Samdhooh; (penalty scored) Ashad; (penalty scored) Assadhulla; (penalty scored) Yaamin

Rasmee Dhandu Stadium, Malé

New Radiant	Maziya

GK	25	(Maldives) Imran Mohamed (c)
RB	4	(Maldives) Ahmed Abdulla
CB	17	(Maldives) Shafiu Ahmed
CB	3	(Maldives) Mohamed Shifan
LB	19	(Maldives) Mohamed Rasheed
DM	23	(Maldives) Ahmed Niyaz	(yellow card) 71'
CM	6	(Australia) Dane Milovanović		(substituted off) 49'
RM	13	(Maldives) Akram Abdul Ghanee
AM	5	(Maldives) Ibrahim Fazeel
LM	17	(Spain) Escobedo Carmona Manuel David		(substituted off) 77'
CF	10	(Maldives) Mohammad Umair
Substitutes:
MF	14	(Maldives) Hamza Mohamed		(substituted in) 49'
FW	24	(Maldives) Ahmed Suhail		(substituted in) 77'
Manager:
(Finland) Mika Lönnström

GK	25	(Maldives) Mohamed Imran
CB	24	(Maldives) Faruhad Ismail	(yellow card) 4'	(substituted off) 59'
CB	18	(Bulgaria) Zhivko Dinev
CB	4	(Maldives) Amdhan Ali
DM	6	(Maldives) Mohamed Arif (c)
CM	16	(Maldives) Mohamed Irufan	(yellow card) 90+1'	(substituted off) 116'
CM	23	(Maldives) Moosa Yaamin
AM	45	(Maldives) Ashad Ali
LF	7	(Maldives) Ibrahim Shiyaam		(substituted off) 71'
RF	29	(Sierra Leone) Abu Desmond Mansaray	(yellow card) 79'
CF	27	(North Macedonia) Riste Naumov
Substitutes:
DF	13	(Maldives) Samdhooh Mohamed		(substituted in) 59'
FW	10	(Maldives) Assadhulla Abdulla		(substituted in) 71'
FW	11	(Maldives) Ahmed Nashid		(substituted in) 116'
Manager:
(Maldives) Ali Suzain

Match rules

- 90 minutes.
- 30 minutes of extra-time if necessary.
- Penalty shoot-out if scores still level.
- Maximum of three substitutions.

== See also ==
- 2014 Maldives FA Cup
