= 2020 Maldives FA Cup =

Tournament details
- Country: Maldives

Final positions
- Champions: None; cancelled and declared null and void

The 2020 Maldives FA Cup was the 30th edition of the Maldives FA Cup, the top-tier knockout football tournament in Maldives organized by the Football Association of Maldives. The tournament returns after two years of absence. A total of eight teams compete in the tournament.

All times local, MVT (UTC+5).

== Quarter-finals ==
5 March 2020
16:00

TC Sports	13–0	Eydhafushi
Ishan 1', 10', 13'; Easa 19', 75'; Ashfaq 7', 55' (pen.), 72', 90+2' (pen.); Malcolm 31', 45', 58'; Farrah 90+3'	Report

National Football Stadium, Malé
Referee: Hussain Sinan (Maldives)

5 March 2020
21:00

Maziya	2–2 (a.e.t.)	Green Streets
Hamza 61'; Mahudhee 120+2'	Report	14' A. Rasheed; 97' Umair
Penalties
Hamza (penalty scored); Samir (penalty scored); Mahudhee (penalty scored); Mujuthaaz (penalty scored); Irufaan (penalty scored); Nihan (penalty scored)	6–5	(penalty scored) Arif; (penalty scored) Elsayed; (penalty scored) Riswan; (penalty scored) A. Rasheed; (penalty scored) Shamal; (penalty missed) Hamdhaan

National Football Stadium, Malé
Referee: Zaheer Hussain (Maldives)

6 March 2020
16:00

Foakaidhoo	0–3	Da Grande
	Report	41' Tholaal; 61', 84' Obaida

National Football Stadium, Malé
Referee: Abdulla Shathir (Maldives)

6 March 2020
21:00

Eagles	12–0	Vilimalé United
Toshiki 6'; Rizuvan 20', 41', 50', 51', 53', 61', 65', 73', 75', 88'; Raif 46'	Report

National Football Stadium, Malé
Referee: Ahmed Aslam (Maldives)

== Semi-finals ==
All football activities in Maldives were suspended indefinitely by the Football Association of Maldives due to COVID-19. Later it was decided the tournament would be cancelled and declared null and void.

16 March 2020
16:00

Maziya	Cancelled	Da Grande

National Football Stadium, Malé

16 March 2020
21:00

TC Sports	Cancelled	Eagles

National Football Stadium, Malé

== Final ==
19 March 2020
21:00

Winner of Semi-final 1	Cancelled	Winner of Semi-final 2

National Football Stadium, Malé

== See also ==
- 2019–20 Dhivehi Premier League
