= Roland Bilala =

Ukrainian footballer

Personal information
- Full name: Roland Rasel Bilala
- Date of birth: 16 December 1990
- Place of birth: Zaporizhia, Ukrainian SSR
- Height: 1.83 m (6 ft 0 in)
- Position: Forward

Youth career
- 2003–2004: FC Metalurh Zaporizhya
- 2004–2007: FC Dynamo Kyiv

Senior career*
Years	Team	Apps	(Gls)
2007–2008	FC Dynamo-3 Kyiv	12	(0)
2008–2010	FC Dynamo Kyiv	0	(0)
2011–2012	FC Tiraspol	20	(3)
2013	FC UkrAhroKom Holovkivka	4	(0)
2014–2015	Igros Krasnobród (amateur)	?	(?)
2015	FC Bukovyna Chernivtsi	13	(4)
2015	Veres Rivne	0	(0)
2016–2017	FC Skala Stryi	21	(3)
2017	FC Ternopil	2	(0)
2017–2018	FK Panevėžys	15	(4)
2018	Club Green Streets	29	(27)
2019	Minerva Punjab	3	(1)

International career
2006–2007	Ukraine-17	6	(0)
- * Club domestic league appearances and goals as of 19 April 2019

Roland Rasel Bilala (Ukrainian: Роланд Расель Еменович Білала; born 16 December 1990 in Zaporizhia) is a Ukrainian professional association football player who currently plays as a striker and last played for Minerva Punjab FC in the I-League.

== Club career ==
Bilala began his senior club career with FC Dynamo-3 Kyiv in 2007. He has also played for Dynamo Kyiv (reserves). In Summer 2011, he moved to the Moldovan National Division side FC Tiraspol. He appeared in 20 matches for the club, scoring 3 goals.

In 2013, he signed with UkrAhroKom Holovkivka and played 4 matches in the Ukrainian First League before moving to an amateur side Igros Krasnobród. In 2015, he came back to professional football with Ukrainian Second Division outfit FSC Bukovyna Chernivtsi. He played 13 league matches for the side, scoring 3 goals. In December 2015, he signed for another Ukrainian side NK Veres Rivne but has not played any league match.

In the 2016–17 Ukrainian First League, he played for Skala Stryi and scored 3 goals in 21 matches. At the end of the league, Skala Stryi relegated after finishing 17th and Bilala signed for FC Ternopil. But it was not a suitable stint in his career and he moved to Lithuania in 2017.

Bilala joined Lithuanian A Lyga side FK Panevėžys on one year deal. With FK Panevėžys, he played in the 2017-18 A Lyga. He scored 4 goals in 15 league matches before moving to Maldivian Dhivehi Premier League outfit Club Green Streets. He scored four goals in a match against giants New Radiant S.C. in November 2018.

In 2019, Bilala signed for I-League side Minerva Punjab FC of India. He debuted for the club in the AFC Champions League (prilimenary round) qualification match against Saipa FC of Iran. He has also appeared in 3 league matches and scored 1 goal against Chennai City FC on 9 March.

== International career ==
In 2006, Bilala was called up in the squad of Ukraine U17 team and appeared in 6 matches until 2007.

== Career statistics ==
=== Club ===
As of 12 March 2021

Club	Season	League			National Cup		Continental		Other		Total	
Club	Season	Division	Apps	Goals	Apps	Goals	Apps	Goals	Apps	Goals	Apps	Goals
FC Dynamo-3 Kyiv	2007–08	Ukrainian Second League	12	0	—		—		—		12	0
FC Tiraspol	2011–12	Moldovan National Division	20	3	—		—		—		20	3
FC UkrAhroKom Holovkivka	2012–13	Ukrainian First League	4	0	—		—		—		4	0
FSC Bukovyna Chernivtsi	2015	Ukrainian First League	13	4	0	0	—		—		13	4
FC Skala Stryi	2016–17	Ukrainian First Division	21	3	—		—		—		21	3
FC Ternopil	2017–18	Ukrainian Second League	2	0	0	0	—		—		2	0
FK Panevėžys	2017–18	A Lyga	15	4	—		—		—		15	4
Club Green Streets	2018	Dhivehi Premier League	29	27	—		—		—		29	7
Minerva Punjab FC	2018–19	I-League	3	1	—		—		—		3	1
Career total			119	42	0	0	0	0	0	0	119	22

== Personal life ==
He was born in Zaporizhzhia, a city in the south-eastern Ukraine. His father is of Congolese descent and his mother is Ukrainian.

== See also ==
- Ukrainian expatriate footballers
