= Giacomo Ratto =

Italian soccer player

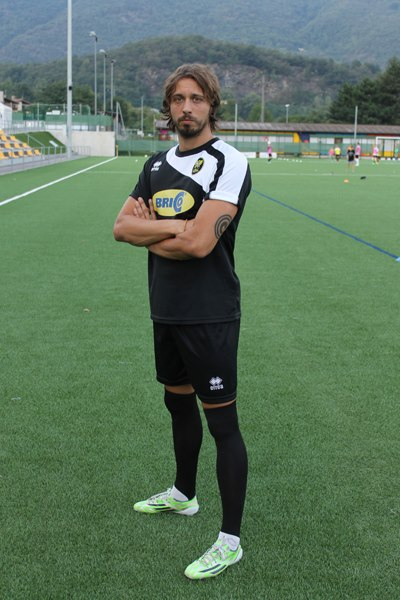
- Giacomo Ratto with AC Taverne

Personal information
- Date of birth: 19 April 1986 (age 40)
- Place of birth: Varese, Italy
- Height: 1.80 m (5 ft 11 in)
- Position: Goalkeeper

Youth career
- 1999-2004: Varese Calcio

Senior career*
Years	Team	Apps	(Gls)
2005-2006	Luino Calcio		
2006-2007	FC Tradate		
2007-2008	A.S.D. Morazzone		
2008-2009	ASD Malnatese Calcio		
2009-2010	U.P. Gavirate Calcio		
2010-2011	AS Castello		
2011	FC Mendrisio-Stabio		
2012	ASD Leggiuno	14	(0)
2013	Victoria Wanderers	11	
2014	UNAN Managua	2	(0)
2015	Suva		
2015	AC Taverne	2	
2016	Ulaanbaatar City	19	
2017-2018	Victoria Wanderers	14	
2018-2019	Vestri	2	
2019-2020	Fgura United	0	(0)
2019–2022	Victoria Wanderers	24	(0)
2022–2023	Club Eydhafushi		
2022–2023	Nilandhoo		
- * Club domestic league appearances and goals

Giacomo Ratto (born 19 April 1986 in Varese, Italy) is an Italian former footballer who plays as goalkeeper. He has played for clubs in many countries, including Panama, Nicaragua, Fiji, Switzerland, Mongolia, Greece, Malta, Iceland and Maldives.

== Career ==
=== Early career: 2005-12 ===
Ratto began playing football at the age of 8 with the US Bosto youth system, before moving to Varese Calcio at the age of 14. He then continued his career in the youth team of a club that, at the time, played in Serie C, but failed to debut in the first team. He moved to Luino Calcio in 2005, where he made his senior debut in Promozione with the Captain Bellini Stefano, helping the team to a second-place finish in the league and winning the play-offs. He won his first league in the following season at FC Tradate. In all the following 3 seasons he changes team, playing in Eccellenza and Promozione. In 2010 Ratto had his first experience abroad, in Switzerland at AS Castello and, later, at FC Mendrisio Stabio. In 2012 he returned to Luino Calcio, team in which he had his senior debut.

=== Malta-Panama: 2013 ===
Sending highlights packages and his resume to retired Maltese goalkeeper Mario Muscat, he arranged his move to S.K. Victoria Wanderers which happened in early 2013. Arriving at the end of the first round, Ratto made his debut in a 3-0 second round victory over Sannat Lions and conceding three goals in his first five fieldings. He finished the season with 5 clean sheets in 11 games helping to bring the team from seventh to third place. He left Gozo at the end of the contract and joined the preseason at Tauro FC team of the Panamanian top league, during which he played some friendly games before moving back to Italy due to personal problems.

=== Nicaragua: 2014 ===
Completing a transfer to UNAN Managua of Nicaragua in July 2014 through agent Carlos Francisco Fariñas on the recommendations of Giampaolo Gronchi of Tauro and Brian Azzopardi of Victoria Wanderers, Ratto recorded his maiden appearance when Los Universitarios were beaten by C.D. Walter Ferretti, a match in which he was chosen as one of the three players in the running for the man of the match award. After his last appearance against Real Madriz, he received an offer from Khoromkhon of the Mongolian Premier League to play the AFC Cup, which caused him to split ways with UNAN, also rejecting an offer from Costa Rica. However, they were withdrawn from the AFC Cup 2015, the second-tier Asian competition, so the deal fell through.

=== Fiji and Switzerland: 2015 ===
Failing to land a deal in Albania, Ratto exchanged information with Suva coach Gurjit Singh, sealing an agreement with them in spring 2015 with Spaniard Adrián Garrido Medina, but was unable to take part in the OFC Champions League as there were registration issues. In July of the same year he returned to Switzerland to AC Taverne, a club in 2. Liga Interregional, signing a 5-month contract. In October, after an injury, he terminated his contract due to non-payment of his salary.

=== Zimbabwe and Mongolia: 2016 ===
Fielded at the preseason four-side Bulawayo Football Festival by Tsholotsho of the Zimbabwe Premier Soccer League in 2016, he played the tournament with the Zhwane Boys. Working toward a contract in South Africa, he got in touch with Cape Town-based football instructor Hendrik Pieter de Jongh who got him a six-month deal in Mongolia with Ulaanbaatar City in 2016, causing him to be the first Italian footballer in the country. Arriving in April in the Mongolian capital with the aim of winning the championship, Ratto played a good season helping the team, which in the league had some difficulties and finished in eighth place, to reach the third place in the Mongolian Cup. During the summer break he receives the opportunity to take part in the CONCACAF Champions League with Don Bosco in Haiti which fell through.

=== Greece: 2017 ===
Reported to contend for Philippos Alexandreia of the Greek Gamma Ethniki in 2017, he was fielded for the first time against Kilkisiakos which ended 0-0. Unfortunately, registration problems coupled with transfer deadline issues forced him to give up on the deal so he trained alone for several months.

=== Malta: 2018 ===
Ratto returned to S.K. Victoria Wanderers in the middle of the 2017-18 season, with the team at the last place in the standings. During the remaining 14 games Ratto achieve 4 clean sheets, helping the team to avoid relegation, obtained with the victory of play-outs against Sannat Lions.

=== Iceland and Malta: 2019 ===
At the end of March Ratto joins Vestri for a week trial in Spain. After having impressed the coach, he accepted the one-year contract offered by the club. During the season he played two cup games but left the club in July. After training alone for three months, he signed a contract with Fgura United, a Maltese First Division team, in which, however, he did not play official matches due to restrictions on the use of foreign players. With the Maltese team he played two friendly games against Floriana FC and Marsaxlokk FC making a good impression before terminate the contract to return to S.K. Victoria Wanderers.

=== Malta: 2020 ===
On 3 January 2020 he signed for S.K. Victoria Wanderers for the third time in his career. Before the stop of the league due by Covid-19 pandemic, decided on 25 March 2020, Ratto played 8 games achieving 3 clean sheets; with the final stop of the league, arrived on 13 May 2020, the team stayed in the Gozo Football League First Division closing the season at 7th place.

=== Malta: 2020-2021 ===
On 13 July 2020 he extended his contract with S.K. Victoria Wanderers until 8 June 2021. During this season Ratto played 9 times in Gozo Football League First Division, competition in which the team closed again in 7th position. In this season Ratto made his debut in the Maltese FA Trophy, playing on 27 December 2020 the preliminary round against Marsaxlokk F.C. At the end of the season due to the new restrictive measures for the containment of Covid-19 in the Maltese archipelago, Ratto made 12 appearances (9 in the Gozo Football League First Division, 1 in Maltese FA Trophy and 2 in G.F.A. Cup).

=== Malta: 2021-2022 ===
On 9 June 2021 he extended his contract with S.K. Victoria Wanderers until 8 June 2022. After 5 total seasons, during which he made 49 league appearances, 1 FA Cup and 2 GFA Cup, Ratto’s career in Gozo ended on 10 November by mutual agreement with the club.

=== Maldives: 2022-2023 ===
On September 23, Ratto signed with Club Eydhafushi, through a negotiation conducted by Egyptian agent Ahmed Rashwan at the specific request of coach Mohamed Athif. His first experience in the Maldives ended on 6 October with the victory of Central League Zone Group A. On October 18, thanks to positive performances at Club Eydhafushi, he was purchased by Nilandhoo SC to play in Group D of the Central League Zone. Also this time Ratto ended with the title, won by Nilandhoo on 20 November.

== Personal life ==
He supports Deportivo de La Coruña in Spain as well as Torino in his home country.

== Honours ==
=== Club ===
Luino Calcio

- Promozione play-offs: 2005-06

FC Tradate

- Promozione: 2006-07

S.K. Victoria Wanderers

- Gozo Football League First Division: 3rd Place, 2012-13

Ulaanbaatar City FC

- Mongolia Cup: 3rd Place, 2016

Vestri

- 2. deild karla: 2nd Place, 2019

Club Eydhafushi

- Central League Zone Group A: Champions, 2022/23

Nilandhoo SC

- Central League Zone Group D: Champions, 2022/23

=== Individual ===
- MVP Walter Ferretti-UNAN Managua, 3 August 2014
- Corriere dello Sport: Top 100 Italian Players Abroad, 2016
- AMA Livestream Gozo: Save of the Season, 2020/2021
