= Faruhad Ismail =

Maldivian footballer

Personal information
- Full name: Faruhad Ismail
- Date of birth: 16 September 1985 (age 41)
- Height: 1.80 m (5 ft 11 in)
- Positions: Winger; defender; midfielder

Team information
- Current team: United Victory

Senior career*
Years	Team	Apps	(Gls)
2003–2006	Victory		
2007–2008	Club Valencia		
2009–2010	New Radiant		
2011–2012	VB Sports Club		
2013	BG Sports Club		
2014–2015	Maziya		
2016	New Radiant		
2017	Green Streets		
2018	United Victory		
2019–2020	Nilandhoo		
2020	→ Club Eagles (loan)		
2020–	United Victory		

International career
- Maldives U19
2011–	Maldives	2	(0)
- * Club domestic league appearances and goals

Faruhad Ismail (born 7 May 1979) is a Maldivian professional footballer. He made his first appearance for the Maldives national football team in 2011.
