= Ibrahim Labaan Shareef =

Maldivian footballer

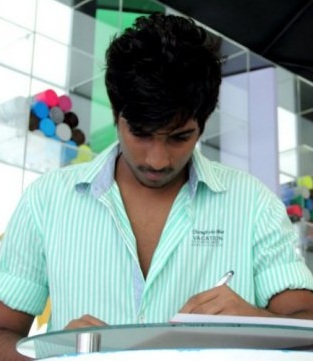

Personal information
- Full name: Labaan Shareef
- Date of birth: 18 January 1996 (age 30)
- Place of birth: Maldives
- Height: 1.82 m (6 ft 0 in)
- Position: Goalkeeper

Team information
- Current team: Club Valencia
- Number: 25

Senior career*
Years	Team	Apps	(Gls)
2012	New Radiant SC		(0)
2013	Club Valencia	2	

International career
2008	Maldives	0	(0)
2010	Maldives U16	10	(0)
2012	Maldives U23	2	(0)
2013	Maldives U19	4	(0)
- * Club domestic league appearances and goals

Ibrahim Labaan Shareef (born 18 January 1996) is a Maldivian professional footballer who plays as a goalkeeper. He currently plays for Club Valencia. Labaan made his debut in the Dhivehi Premier League on 25 May 2013.

== International career ==
Labaan has played several competitions like AFC U-21 Qualifying for the Maldives, and has played for Maldives national under-17 football team. He played four matches in AFC U-19 Qualifications held In Amman, Jordan, and got Man Of The Match against Afghanistan.
