= Saqib Hanif =

Pakistani footballer (born 1994)

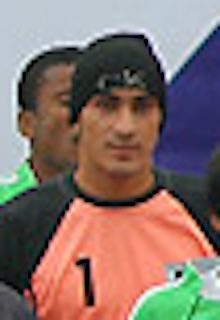
- Hanif with Pakistan U19 in 2009

Personal information
- Date of birth: 23 April 1994 (age 32)
- Place of birth: Bannu, Pakistan
- Height: 1.79 m (5 ft 10 in)
- Position: Goalkeeper

Team information
- Current team: New Radiant
- Number: 1

Senior career*
Years	Team	Apps	(Gls)
2009–2011	Pak Elektron	56	(0)
2011–2012	Zarai Taraqiati	7	(0)
2012–2016	Khan Research Laboratories	33	(0)
2016–2018	B.G.	11	(0)
2018	A. A. Maalhos	6	(0)
2018–2019	Sui Southern Gas	12	(0)
2019–2020	Foakaidhoo		
2020	T.C. Sports Club		
2020	Green Streets		
2020–2021	Sui Southern Gas		
2021–2023	Green Streets		
2023–2024	Victory SC		
2025	Green Streets		
2025–2026	New Radiant		
2026-	Club Eagles		

International career^{‡}
2012–2018	Pakistan U23		
2013–	Pakistan	11	(0)
- * Club domestic league appearances and goals as of 27 September 2025 ‡ National team caps and goals as of 10 June 2026

Saqib Hanif (born 23 April 1994) is a Pakistani professional footballer who plays as a goalkeeper for Dhivehi Premier League club Club Eagles and the Pakistan national team.

== Club career ==
=== Early career ===
Hanif played as a forward in his youth until making his switch as a goalkeeper. He subsequently played for PEL FC and Zarai Taraqiati in senior level.

=== Khan Research Laboratories ===
Hanif signed for Khan Research Laboratories in 2012, where he won two successive Pakistan Premier Football League titles from 2012 to 2014. In 2012, he was offered a playing contract from Dhaka Mahommedan in the Bangladesh Premier League, but it seemingly failed to materialise. He was a member of the team which reached the 2013 AFC President's Cup final, after falling to Turkmen club Balkan FT by 0–1 in the final.

=== BG Sports ===
In 2016, Hanif signed for the Maldives football team B.G. Sports Club. He earned the man-of-the-match award for BG Sports at the Dhivehi Premier League on a match against Club Valencia.

=== Maalhos ===
He moved to the Maldivian club Maalhos in 2018.

=== Sui Southern Gas ===
He returned shortly after to Pakistan, joining SSGC FC.

=== Foakaidhoo ===
He signed for Foakaidhoo FC in Maldives in June 2019.

=== TC Sports ===
Hanif had a short stint at TC Sports Club. He was quarantined in the Maldives soon after he along with his team reached Male. The team was returning to Maldives via Colombo after playing the 2020 AFC Cup against Bangladesh’s Bashundhara Kings on March 11 in Dhaka. When the team reached Colombo, Maldives’ government told them to live in quarantine before coming to Maldives. When the team spent its quarantine in Colombo a lockdown started and so Saqib and his teammates spent around 25 days in the Sri Lankan capital.

=== Green Streets & return to Sui Southern Gas ===
Hanif moved to Club Green Streets in 2020. By the end of the year, Hanif returned to SSGC participating in the 2020 PFF National Challenge Cup. He helped the side reach the semi-finals, after his performance in the penalty shootout against Pakistan Air Force, until eventually finishing as runner-ups of the tournament. He returned to the Maldivian club later on.

=== Victory SC ===
In October 2023, Hanif moved to Victory Sports Club. He played a key role for the club in achieving their promotion to the Dhivehi Premier League after four years, after defeating New Radiant in the semi-final of the Maldivian Second Division Football Tournament by 2–0. The club eventually fell against Masodi Sports Club in final by 2–3, with both finalists achieving their promotion to the top-tier.

== International career ==
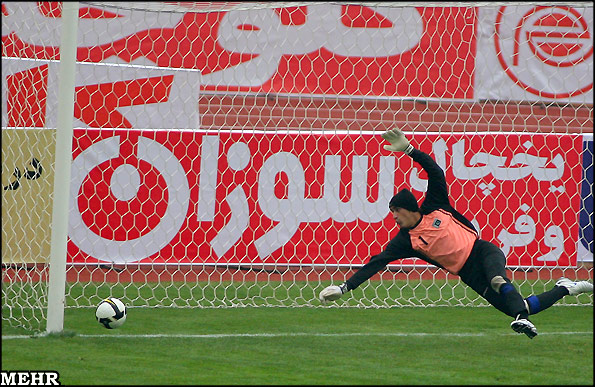
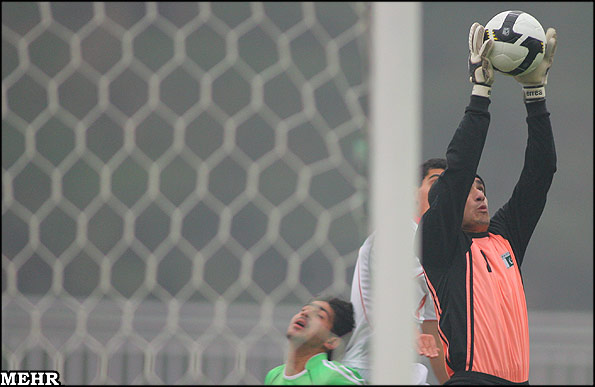
Hanif in action for Pakistan U19 during 2010 AFC U-19 Championship qualification against Iran

Hanif represented Pakistan at youth level as a midfielder in the Asian U-13 Championship 2005. He later represented Pakistan under-19 at the 2010 AFC U-19 Championship qualification.

Hanif was first called by the international coach Zaviša Milosavljević in 2012 to represent the Pakistan national under-23 team in the 2013 AFC U-22 qualifiers, where he was praised by the coach due to his performance. He made his senior international debut in 2013, in a friendly against Afghanistan at the age of 19. He was later called against Bangladesh in the 2013 SAFF Championship. He also played for the national under-23 team at the 2018 Asian Games as vice-captain.

== Career statistics ==
=== International ===
As of 10 June 2026

Appearances and goals by national team and year
National team	Year	Apps	Goals
Pakistan	2013	2	0
Pakistan	2014	2	0
Pakistan	2015	1	0
Pakistan	2023	3	0
Pakistan	2025	2	0
Pakistan	2026	1	0
Total		11	0

== Honours ==
Khan Research Laboratories

- Pakistan Premier League: 2012–13, 2013–14
- National Football Challenge Cup: 2012, 2015, 2016

Pakistan

- Diamond Jubilee International Football Tournament: 2026
