= Oleh Yefimchuk =

Ukrainian footballer

Personal information
- Full name: Oleh Yuryevich Yefimchuk
- Date of birth: 15 March 1994 (age 32)
- Place of birth: Vuhledar, Ukraine
- Height: 1.83 m (6 ft 0 in)
- Position: Defender

Youth career
- Olimpik Donetsk
- Shakhtar Donetsk
- Metalurh Donetsk

Senior career*
Years	Team	Apps	(Gls)
2011–2015	Metalurh Donetsk	0	(0)
2016	Stal Kamianske	0	(0)
2017	Metalurh Zaporizhzhia	28	(1)
2018	Green Streets		
- * Club domestic league appearances and goals

Oleh Yuryevich Yefimchuk (Russian: Олег Ефимчук; born 15 March 1994) is a Ukrainian former footballer who is last known to have played as a defender for Green Streets.

== Career ==
Before the 2018 season, Yefimchuk signed for Maldivian side Green Streets from Metalurh (Zaporizhya) in the Ukrainian third division.
