= Hassan Nazeem =

Maldivian footballer (born 2001)

Personal information
- Full name: Hassan Nazeem
- Date of birth: 24 May 2001 (age 25)
- Place of birth: Malé, Maldives
- Position: Forward

Team information
- Current team: Victory
- Number: 14

Youth career
- ETFA
- 2012–2013: Jamaluddin School
- 2019: Foakaidhoo

Senior career*
Years	Team	Apps	(Gls)
2018–2020	Foakaidhoo		
2020	→ Eagles (loan)	4	(1)
2020	Maldives U19	3	(0)
2020–2021	Green Streets		
2022–2026	Maziya		
2026–	Victory		

International career^{‡}
- Maldives U14
2019	Maldives U18	4	(1)
2019	Maldives U19	3	(1)
2019–	Maldives U23	3	(0)
2019–	Maldives	4	(1)
- * Club domestic league appearances and goals ‡ National team caps and goals as of 6:18, 11 October 2023 (UTC)

Hassan Nazeem (born 24 May 2001) nicknamed "Choatu", is a Maldivian footballer who plays as a forward for Victory and the Maldives national team.

== International career ==
Nazeem made his debut for Maldives on 5 September 2019 in the 2022 FIFA World Cup qualifiers match against Guam, as a 69th minute substitute replacing Asadhulla Abdulla.

=== International goals ===
International goals by date, venue, opponent, score, result and competition
No.	Date	Venue	Opponent	Score	Result	Competition
1	12 October 2023	National Football Stadium, Malé	Bangladesh	1–0	1–1	2026 FIFA World Cup qualification
