= 2018 Minivan Championship =

Minivan Championship
- Season: 2018

The 2018 Minivan Championship Football Tournament is the fourth season under its current tournament format.

== Group stage ==
=== Group 1 ===
Southern Group, played at Nilandhoo.

Pos	Team	Pld	W	D	L	GF	GA	GD	Pts	Qualification or relegation
1	Thaa Thimarafushi	4	3	0	1	7	3	+4	9	Qualification to 2018 Dhivehi Premier League
2	Faafu Nilandhoo	4	2	2	0	12	5	+7	8	Qualification to 2018 Dhivehi Premier League
3	S. Hithadhoo	4	1	2	1	7	5	+2	5	
4	Dh. Kudahuvadhoo	4	1	2	1	5	3	+2	5	
5	GDh. Hoandehdhoo	4	0	0	4	3	18	−15	0	

=== Group 2 ===
Northern Group, played at Foakaidhoo.

Pos	Team	Pld	W	D	L	GF	GA	GD	Pts	Qualification or relegation
1	Shaviyani Foakaidhoo	4	3	1	0	7	4	+3	10	Qualification to 2018 Dhivehi Premier League
2	Baa Fehendhoo	4	3	0	1	14	5	+9	9	Qualification to 2018 Dhivehi Premier League
3	AA. Maalhos	4	2	1	1	9	2	+7	7	
4	HA. Muraidhoo	4	1	0	3	6	10	−4	3	
5	Adh. Fenifushi	4	0	0	4	2	17	−15	0	

== Semi-finals ==
4 May 2018

Thimarafushi	2–1	Fehendhoo

5 May 2018

Foakaidhoo	2–0	Nilandhoo

== Final ==
10 May 2018

Thimarafushi	3–0	Foakaidhoo

Galolhu National Stadium, Malé
