= Weerasinghe Sujan Perera =

Sri Lankan footballer (born 1992)

Personal information
- Full name: Weerasinghe Sinnath Thommelage Don Sujan Perera
- Date of birth: 18 July 1992 (age 34)
- Place of birth: Colombo, Sri Lanka
- Height: 1.80 m (5 ft 11 in)
- Position: Goalkeeper

Team information
- Current team: Fortis
- Number: 1

Senior career*
Years	Team	Apps	(Gls)
2011–2015	Kalutara Park		
2015–2020	Club Eagles	19	(0)
2020–2022	Up Country Lions	9	(2)
2022–2025	TC Sports Club	34	(0)
2025–	Fortis	9	(0)

International career^{‡}
2011–2026	Sri Lanka	68	(0)
Medal record
Men's football
Representing Sri Lanka
2021 Four Nations Football Tournament
Runner-up	2021 Sri Lanka
- * Club domestic league appearances and goals ‡ National team caps and goals as of 5 October 2026

Weerasinghe Sinnath Thommelage Don Sujan Perera (Sinhala: වීරසිංහ සින්නත් තොම්මලගේ දොන් සුජාන් පෙරේරා) is a Sri Lankan professional footballer who plays as a goalkeeper for Bangladesh Football League club Fortis.

== Career ==
He joined Club Eagles for the 2019–20 Dhivehi Premier League in Maldieves.

In 2025, he joined Bangladeshi club Fortis for the 2025–26 Bangladesh Football League. His club finished second in the first round of the league season, with him keeping seven clean sheets in the first nine games, for which he received recognition.
