= Sabah Mohamed =

Maldivian footballer

Personal information
- Full name: Sabah Mohamed Ibrahim
- Date of birth: 18 April 1980 (age 46)
- Position: Defender

Senior career*
Years	Team	Apps	(Gls)
–2001	Club Eagles		
2002–2004	Club Valencia		
2005–2008	New Radiant		
2009–2011	Victory		
2011	New Radiant		
2012	VB Addu FC		
2012	Club Eagles		
2013–2014	Victory		
2015	New Radiant		

International career
2001–2011	Maldives	?	(?)

Managerial career
- 2015: New Radiant (player coach)
- 2016–2017: Green Streets
- 2018: Valencia
- * Club domestic league appearances and goals

Sabah Mohamed Ibrahim (born 18 April 1980) is a Maldivian footballer who plays for New Radiant as a defender. He represented Maldives at international level from 2001 to 2011.

== Career ==
Sabah has played club football for Club Eagles, Club Valencia and New Radiant. He then joined Victory SC and left the club in the middle of the 2011 season. After the 2011 season, he joined VB Addu FC for a one-year contract. Before the contract ends, VB Addu FC released him in the mid-season and Sobah joined Club Eagles.

He made his international debut in 2001.

== Honours ==
Maldives

- SAFF Championship: 2008
