= Ansar Ibrahim =

Maldivian footballer (born 1995)

Personal information
- Full name: Ansar Ibrahim
- Date of birth: 25 February 1995 (age 31)
- Place of birth: B. Thulhaadhoo, Maldives
- Position: Midfielder

Team information
- Current team: Foakaidhoo
- Number: 20

Youth career
- Arabiyya School
- 2012: Club Eagles
- 2013: Club Valencia
- 2014–2016: Club Eagles

Senior career*
Years	Team	Apps	(Gls)
2014–2017	Club Eagles		
2017	→ Thinadhoo (loan)		
2018	Club Valencia		
2019–	Foakaidhoo		

International career
- Maldives U19
- Maldives U23
2015–	Maldives	5	(0)
- * Club domestic league appearances and goals

Ansar Ibrahim (born 25 February 1995), nicknamed Anko, is a Maldivian professional footballer who plays for Dhivehi League side Eagles FC and the Maldives national team. He is an attacking midfielder. He was born in Thulhaadhoo, Maldives. He made his debut for the Maldives national football team in 2015.
