= Nilandhoo Sports Club =

Nilandhoo
- Full name: Nilandhoo Sports Club
- Ground: F. Nilandhoo Football Ground
- Coordinates: 03°03′20″N 72°53′28″E
- President: Anwar Ali
- Head coach: Ahmed Mujuthaba
- League: Dhivehi Premier League
- 2019–20: Dhivehi Premier League, 8th
| Home colours | Away colours |

Nilandhoo Sports Club, is a Maldivian football club in Nilandhoo (Faafu Atoll), that competes in the Dhivehi Premier League, the highest tier of Maldivian football.

== History ==
Nilandhoo was promoted to Dhivehi Premier League as 2018 Minivan Championship semi finalists. They were beaten in the semi-final to runner-up Foakaidhoo FC. Nilandhoo finished above all promoted teams; 6th in their first Premier League campaign in 2018, successfully retaining their spot in the first division.

== Management team ==
| Position | Staff |
|---|---|
| Manager | (Maldives) Ibrahim Ahmed |
| Head coach | (Maldives) Ahmed Mujuthaba |
| Goalkeeper coach | (Maldives) Ibrahim Ahmed |
| Medical Officer | (Maldives) Dr. Ayathulla Ibrahim Rasheed |
| Officials | (Maldives) Ahmed Muruthala |
| Officials | (Maldives) Ali Waheed |
| Officials | (Maldives) Abdhulla Ahmed |
| Officials | (Maldives) Wajeeh Moosa |
| Officials | (Maldives) Mohamed Naseer |
| Officials | (Maldives) Ahmed Niyaz |
