= Maafannu =

Coordinates: 4.175°N 73.504°E

Maafannu މާފަންނު
- District of Malé
- Interactive map of Maafannu
- Country: Maldives

Government
  - Council: Malé City Council

Population (2022)
  - Total: 47,036
- Time zone: UTC+05:00 (MVT)

Maafannu (Dhivehi: މާފަންނު) is a district of Malé, Maldives.

== Location within Malé City ==
Maafannu is on the western portion of Malé Island:

== Notable Places ==
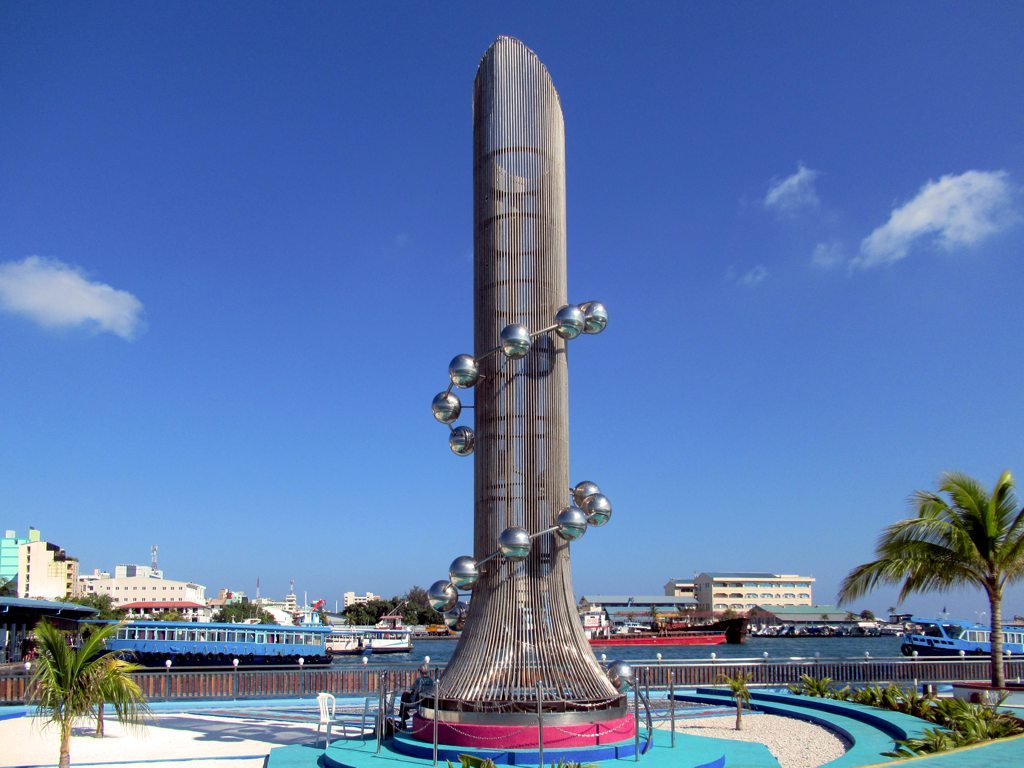
Tsunami Monument

- Indira Gandhi Memorial Hospital
- Maldives National University Faculty of Health Sciences
- Rasfannu Artificial Beach
- Schwack Cinema
- Theemuge (Supreme Court)
- Tsunami Monument
- Villingili Ferry Terminal
- Voice of Maldives
