= Foakaidhoo FC =

Foakaidhoo
- Full name: Foakaidhoo Football Club
- Short name: FFC
- Founded: 1986; 39 years ago
- Ground: Foakaidhoo Football Ground
- Coordinates: 06°19′35″N 73°08′57″E
- Head coach: Ali Nisthar Mohamed
- League: Dhivehi Premier League
- 2018: Dhivehi Premier League, 7th
Home colours	Away colours

Foakaidhoo Football Club, is a Maldivian football club in Foakaidhoo (Shaviyani Atoll), that competes in the Dhivehi Premier League, the highest tier of Maldivian football.

== History ==
Foakaidhoo played first division football during the mid-2000s, before getting relegated.

== Players ==
=== Current squad ===
As of 16 June 2019

Note: Flags indicate national team as defined under FIFA eligibility rules; some limited exceptions apply. Players may hold more than one non-FIFA nationality.

No.	Pos.	Nation	Player
1	GK	(Pakistan) PAK	Saqib Hanif
2	DF	(Maldives) MDV	Naif Adam
3	DF	(Maldives) MDV	Ishaq Rasheed
4	DF	(Egypt) EGY	Mahmoud Sayed Mohamed Abdelrahim
5	MF	(Maldives) MDV	Hussain Fazeel (Captain)
6	MF	(Egypt) EGY	Khalil Gamal Khalil Elbezawy (3rd captain)
7	FW	(Maldives) MDV	Mohamed Jailam (vice-captain)
8	MF	(Maldives) MDV	Nadheem Navaz
9	FW	(Maldives) MDV	Hussain Nabeeh
10	FW	(Egypt) EGY	Mostafa Mohamed Mohamed Seddik
11	FW	(Maldives) MDV	Hassan Nazeem
12	MF	(Maldives) MDV	Mohamed Karam
13	DF	(Maldives) MDV	Ahmed Assadh
14	DF	(Maldives) MDV	Mohamed Inshau Ahmed
16	FW	(Maldives) MDV	Hassan Fuvaadh
17	MF	(Maldives) MDV	Ali Shaamiu
18	MF	(Maldives) MDV	Aidh Mohamed
19	MF	(Maldives) MDV	Mohamed Naseer

No.	Pos.	Nation	Player
20	MF	(Maldives) MDV	Ansar Ibrahim
21	DF	(Maldives) MDV	Yoosuf Junaidh Zahir
22	DF	(Maldives) MDV	Ibrahim Aflaah
23	FW	(Maldives) MDV	Hussain Lamaan Ahmed
24	MF	(Maldives) MDV	Ibrahim Haseeb
25	GK	(Maldives) MDV	Hussain Shifadh Mohamed
26	DF	(Maldives) MDV	Hussain Naveen
27	DF	(Maldives) MDV	Ahmed Amjadhu
28	MF	(Maldives) MDV	Ahmed Jinaah
30	DF	(Maldives) MDV	Nasfaan Rasheed
32	DF	(Maldives) MDV	Haany Khaleel
33	MF	(Maldives) MDV	Ahmed Samaal
34	MF	(Maldives) MDV	Ahmed Naufal
37	MF	(Maldives) MDV	Hussain Sinaan
38	DF	(Maldives) MDV	Ali Shamis
45	FW	(Maldives) MDV	Ahmed Ruham
47	MF	(Maldives) MDV	Mohamed Yaamin

== Management team ==
Position	Staff
Manager	(Maldives) Ahmed Asif
Assistant manager	(Maldives) Mohamed Rimaz
Head coach	(Maldives) Ali Nisthar Mohamed
Goalkeeper coach	(Maldives) Mohamed Akram
Medical Officer	(Maldives) Hassan Rif'aan
Officials	(Maldives) Ahmed Husham
Officials	(Maldives) Ismail Asif
Officials	(Maldives) Abdulla Haanim
Officials	(Maldives) Mohamed Shiham
