= Abdulla Yaameen =

Maldivian footballer

Personal information
- Full name: Abdulla Yaameen
- Date of birth: 30 December 2000 (age 25)
- Place of birth: H.A. Hoarafushi, Maldives
- Position: Midfielder

Team information
- Current team: Green Streets
- Number: 17

Senior career*
Years	Team	Apps	(Gls)
2017–	Green Streets		

International career
2017–	Maldives U19	8	(0)
2018–	Maldives	2	(0)
- * Club domestic league appearances and goals

Abdulla Yaameen (born 30 December 2000), is a Maldivian footballer who plays as a midfielder for Club Green Streets.

== Club career ==
=== Green Streets ===
On 25 February 2017, he made his debut in the Malé League match against Victory Sports Club at the final eight minutes of a 1–0 victory.

== International career ==
Yaameen's first international match was a 3–2 defeat against Singapore on 23 March 2018 at the National Stadium, Singapore, replacing Ali Fasir at stoppage time in the second half to become the youngest player to play for Maldives at the age of 17 years and 85 days, breaking the record of Ali Ashfaq.
