= Miloš Kovačević =

Montenegrin footballer

Personal information
- Full name: Miloš Kovačević
- Date of birth: 31 March 1991 (age 35)
- Place of birth: Vrbas, SFR Yugoslavia
- Height: 1.81 m (5 ft 11 in)
- Position: Defender

Team information
- Current team: United Victory

Senior career*
Years	Team	Apps	(Gls)
2008	Hajduk Kula	1	(0)
2009	Mladost Apatin	7	(0)
2009	→ Bačka Topola (loan)		
2010–2013	Hajduk Kula	31	(1)
2013	→ Novi Sad (loan)	9	(0)
2014–2015	Sūduva	38	(0)
2016	Mika	8	(0)
2016	Petrovac	11	(0)
2017-2019	Maziya		
2019–	United Victory		

International career^{‡}
	Montenegro U19	7	(1)
- * Club domestic league appearances and goals as of 5 November 2019 ‡ National team caps and goals as of 6 September 2012

Miloš Kovačević (Serbian Cyrillic: Милош Ковачевић; born 31 March 1991) is a Montenegrin footballer who plays for Maldivian side United Victory.

== Club career ==
Born in Vrbas, SR Serbia, he debuted as a senior playing in the 2008–09 Serbian SuperLiga with FK Hajduk Kula. During the winter break, he would move to FK Mladost Apatin playing in the Serbian First League. He would start the 2009–10 season by playing on loan with FK Bačka Topola but in the winter break he would sign back with Hajduk Kula and thus return to top league football.

== International career ==
At national team level, he has played with the Montenegrin under-19 team.
