= Foakaidhoo =

Foakaidhoo ފޯކައިދޫ
- Inhabited island
- Location in Maldives
- Coordinates: 06°19′35″N 73°08′57″E
- Country: Maldives
- Geographic atoll: Miladhummadulhu Atoll
- Administrative atoll: Shaviyani Atoll
- Distance to Malé: 241.2 km (149.9 mi)

Dimensions
  - Length: 1.050 km (0.652 mi)
  - Width: 0.680 km (0.423 mi)

Population (2022)
  - Total: 1,571
- Time zone: UTC+05:00 (MST)

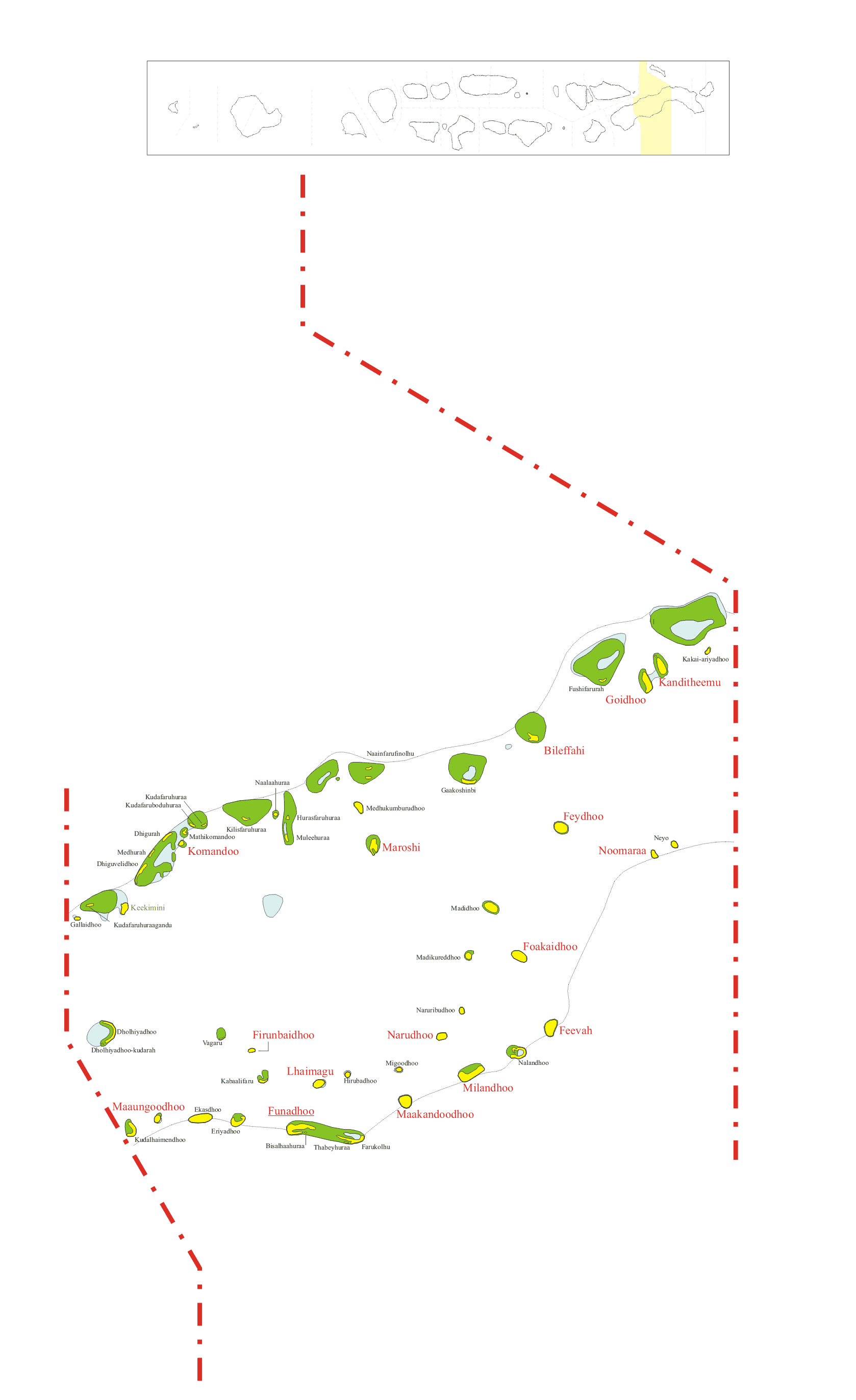
Map of the islands of the Shaviyani Atoll administrative division, with Foakaidhoo on the center right (map originally vectored by Hassan Waheed)

Foakaidhoo (Dhivehi: ފޯކައިދޫ) is one of the inhabited islands of the Shaviyani Atoll administrative division and geographically part of the Miladhummadulhu Atoll in the Maldives.

== History ==
Foakaidhoo was one of the islands damaged during the great cyclone of 1821 that hit the northern atolls of the Maldives. This was during the reign of Sultan Muhammad Mueenuddeen I.

== Geography ==
The island is 241.2 km (150 mi; 130 nmi) north of the country's capital, Malé.

== Demography ==
Historical population
Year	Pop.	±%
2006	1,201	—
2014	1,320	+9.9%
2022	1,571	+19.0%
2006-2014: Census populations Source:
