= Dhivehi Premier League =

Maldivian men's association football league

- Founded: 2000 (Dhivehi League); 2015 (Premier League name)
- Country: Maldives
- Confederation: AFC
- Number of clubs: 10
- Level on pyramid: 1
- Relegation to: FAM Regional Leagues
- Domestic cup(s): FA Cup; President's Cup; Charity Shield; Cup Winners' Cup
- International cup: AFC Challenge League
- Current champions: Maziya (6th title) (2025–26)
- Most championships: Maziya; New Radiant (6 titles each)
- Broadcaster: Television Maldives
- Current: 2026–27 Dhivehi Premier League

The Dhivehi Premier League, known as the Dhiraagu Dhivehi Premier League for sponsorship reasons, is a Maldivian men's professional football league. At the top of the Maldives football league system, it is the country's primary football competition. Contested by 10 clubs, it operates on a system of promotion and relegation with the Second Division Football Tournament.

The league began in 2000 as the Dhivehi League. In December 2014, the Football Association of Maldives normalisation committee announced that the competition would be rebranded as the Dhivehi Premier League for the following season.

== History ==
The Dhivehi League was established in 2000 and brought together clubs from Malé and other islands. It initially served as a qualifying competition for the national championship playoffs; from 2009 it was treated as the national championship.

In December 2014, the Football Association of Maldives announced the Premier League rebranding and a change from three rounds to two for the 2015 season. The announced arrangements provided for automatic relegation of the bottom club, promotion of the Second Division champions, and a playoff between the second-bottom Premier League club and the Second Division runners-up.

=== Champions, 2000–2014 ===
Year	Winning club	Source
2000	Victory Sports Club	
2001	Club Valencia	
2002	Club Valencia	
2003	Club Valencia	
2004	Club Valencia	
2005	Hurriyya SC	
2006	New Radiant S.C.	
2007	Victory Sports Club	
2008	Club Valencia	
2009	VB Sports	
2010	VB Sports	
2011	VB Sports	
2012	New Radiant S.C.	
2013	New Radiant S.C.	
2014	New Radiant S.C.	

=== Champions, 2015 onward ===
The following table covers the Premier League era.

Season	Champions	Runners-up	Topscorers
2015	New Radiant	Trust and Care SC	(Maldives) Assadhulla Abdulla (9 goals)
2016	Maziya	Trust and Care SC	(Maldives) Ali Fasir (29 goals)
2017	New Radiant	Trust and Care SC	(Maldives) Ali Ashfaq (13 goals)
2018	Trust and Care SC	Maziya	(Maldives) Ahmed Rizuvan (31 goals)
2019–20	Maziya	Eagles	(Maldives) Ahmed Rizuvan (28 goals)
2020–21	Maziya	Valencia	(Saint Vincent and the Grenadines) Cornelius Stewart (10 goals)
2022	Maziya	Eagles	(Spain) Tana (18 goals)
2023	Maziya	Eagles	(Maldives) Ahmed Rizuvan (23 goals)
2025–26	Maziya	Odi Sports	TBC

=== Titles by club, 2015 onward ===
Clubs	Champions	Winning season	Runners-up	Runner-up season
Maziya	6	2016, 2019–20, 2020–21, 2022, 2023, 2025–26	1	2018
New Radiant	2	2015, 2017	0	
Trust and Care SC	1	2018	3	2015, 2016, 2017
Eagles	0		3	2019–20, 2022, 2023
Valencia	0		1	2020–21
Odi Sports	0		1	2025–26

Source: RSSSF

== Competition format ==
The Premier League began with eight teams. For the 2015 season, FAM announced a double round-robin format in place of the previous three-round competition. Teams receive three points for a win and one point for a draw. No points are awarded for a loss. Teams are ranked by total points, then goal difference, and then goals scored. If still equal, teams are deemed to occupy the same position. If there is a tie for the championship, for relegation, or for qualification to other competitions, a play-off match decides rank.

In 2025, the league used a ten-team format, with each club playing the others twice for a total of 18 games. Teams are ranked by total points, goal difference, and goals scored. If still equal, teams are deemed to occupy the same position. If there is a tie for the championship or relegation, a play-off match decides the rank. The bottom two teams of the league gets relegated to the Regional Leagues, (the current Second Division), while the teams who finish 7th and 8th respectively they will go to the Promotion/Relegation playoff with the winners of the four FAM Regional League, with the top 6 avoiding relegation all together.

=== Qualification for Asian competitions ===
Under the former AFC Cup arrangements, the league champions qualified for the group stage and the FA Cup winners received a playoff place. If one club won both competitions, the second place went to the league runners-up.

Since the inauguration of the AFC Challenge League in 2024, only one team, the winner qualify for the AFC Challenge League play-offs. The team must win play-offs to get to the group stage.

== Sponsorship ==
Period	Sponsor	Brand
2015–2018	Ooredoo Maldives	Ooredoo Dhivehi Premier League
2019–21	Dhiraagu	Dhiraagu Dhivehi Premier League
2022	Ooredoo Maldives	Ooredoo Dhivehi Premier League
2023	MWSC	MWSC Dhivehi Premier League
2025–	Dhiraagu	Dhiraagu Dhivehi Premier League

== Awards ==
The Football Association of Maldives (FAM) provides each Premier League team with an amount of MVR 1.6 million. The Champion team also receives a MVR 1 million cash prize.

== Current clubs ==
Note: Table lists clubs in alphabetical order.

Team	Location	Stadium	Capacity
Biss Buru Sports Club	Maafannu, Malé	National Football Stadium	4,000
Buru Sports Club	Machchangolhi, Malé	National Football Stadium	4,000
Club Eagles	Maafannu, Malé	National Football Stadium	4,000
Dhidhdhoo Sports	HA. Dhidhdhoo	Dhidhdhoo Football Stadium	1,000
Gadhdhoo Recreation Club	GDh. Gadhdhoo	Gadhdhoo Football Stadium	1,000
Maziya	West Maafannu, Malé	National Football Stadium	4,000
New Radiant	Henveiru, Malé	National Football Stadium	4,000
Odi Sports Club	Galolhu, Malé	National Football Stadium	4,000
TC Sports Club	Henveiru, Malé	National Football Stadium	4,000
Victory Sports Club	Galolhu, Malé	National Football Stadium	4,000

== Statistics ==
=== Historical cumulative standings, including 2015–2016 ===
Pos	Club	Pld	W	D	L	GF	GA	GD	Pts
1	New Radiant SC	234	138	40	56	530	250	+280	454
2	Victory Sports Club	234	118	45	71	483	300	+183	399
3	Club Valencia	234	96	53	85	442	368	+74	341
4	Maziya S&RC	181	93	37	51	357	220	+137	316
5	VB Addu FC	180	92	39	49	448	262	+186	315
6	Club Eagles	118	41	31	46	150	186	-36	154
7	Club All Youth Linkage	105	21	23	61	105	246	-141	86
8	TC Sports Club	35	21	8	6	74	37	+37	71
9	Vyansa	83	17	16	50	78	156	-78	67
10	Hurriyya SC	48	18	12	18	118	85	+33	66
11	BG Sports Club	68	14	18	36	65	118	-53	60
12	Thoddoo FC	51	8	4	39	44	192	-148	28
13	United Victory	21	5	8	8	18	25	-7	23
14	Guraidhoo ZJ	31	5	5	21	41	97	-56	20
15	Mahibadhoo SC	33	4	4	25	38	105	-67	16
16	Rasdhoo JU	12	4	0	8	14	20	-06	12
17	Veymandoo ZJ	17	3	2	12	21	68	-47	11
18	Kelaa YF	12	3	1	8	14	45	-31	10
19	Foakaidhoo ZJ	21	1	5	15	13	65	-52	8
20	Hiriyaa (Hinnavaru)	12	1	2	9	10	49	-39	5
21	Mahibadhoo ZJ	14	1	2	11	11	71	-60	5
22	STELCO	7	1	1	5	7	18	-11	4
23	Haspress Club (Hinnavaru)	5	1	1	3	6	19	-13	4
24	FVD (Vilufushi)	7	1	1	5	4	26	-22	4
25	DX Sports Club (Miladu)	7	0	3	4	6	25	-19	3
26	Thinadhoo	7	0	2	5	4	23	-19	2
27	Thinadhoo ZC	07	0	0	7	5	31	-26	0

Rules for classification: 1) points; 2) goal difference; 3) number of goals scored.

Note

- The first year (2000) results and statistics missing.
- VB Addu FC statistics included VB Sports and Island FC results.
- Thoddoo FC statistics included the results of Kalhaidhoo ZJ.
- 2015 DPL and 2016 DPL statistics included in the table.

=== Premier League cumulative standings, from 2015 ===
The all-time Dhivehi Premier League table is a cumulative record of all match results, points and goals of every team that has played in the Premier League since its inception in 2015. The table below was compiled for seasons through 2025–26. Teams in bold are part of the 2026/27 Premier League.

Pos.	Club	Seasons	Pld	Win	Draw	Loss	GF	GA	GD	Pts	1st	2nd	3rd	4th	Relegated	Best Pos.
1	**Maziya**	10	154	115	24	15	458	108	+350	369	5	1	1	1		1st
2	**Trust and Care** **SC**	10	154	80	27	47	277	194	+83	267	1	3	1	1		1st
3	**Club Eagles**	9	139	77	35	27	305	160	+145	266		2	3	1		2nd
4	**New Radiant**	6	83	48	16	19	174	85	+89	160	2		1	1	1 (Note: New Radiant were suspended from all football related activities before 2019–20 Dhivehi Premier League started, due to unpaid wages to the players and failing to pay fines to FIFA and FAM, resulting in relegation)	1st
5	Green Streets	7	114	39	20	59	164	235	-71	137			1	1		3rd
6	**Victory**	6	85	18	13	54	74	184	-110	54					1	5th
7	Valencia	6	97	30	17	55	114	174	-60	107		1			1	2nd
8	United Victory	6	104	26	22	58	120	224	-104	100				1	1	4th
9	Foakaidhoo	2	37	8	8	21	36	84	−48	32						6th
10	BG Sports	2	35	6	12	17	33	56	−23	30					1	7th
11	Da Grande	3	56	12	12	32	66	107	−41	48					1	5th
12	Super United Sports	3	35	7	9	19	31	66	−35	30						6th
13	Nilandhoo SC	2	32	8	3	21	44	114	−70	27						6th
14	G. Dh. Thinadhoo	1	14	5	3	6	23	18	+5	18				1		4th
15	Sh. Milandhoo	1	14	3	5	6	18	26	−8	14						6th
16	A. A. Maalhos	1	14	2	3	9	18	40	−22	9						7th
17	B. Fehendhoo	1	9	1	1	7	2	30	−28	4					1	9th
18	Dh. Kudahuvadhoo	1	14	0	3	11	6	40	−34	3						8th
19	Mahibadhoo	1	14	0	2	12	12	47	−35	2					1	8th
20	Th. Thimarafushi	1	9	0	1	8	2	37	−35	1					1	10th
21	**Buru SC**	3	32	14	5	13	58	51	+7	47				1		4th
22	**Odi SC**	2	19	12	3	4	40	13	+27	39		1				2nd
21	**Gadhdhoo Recreation Club**	1	0	0	0	0	0	0	0	0				0		-
22	**Dhidhdhoo Sports**	1	0	0	0	0	0	0	0	0				0		-
24	**Biss Buru Sports Club**	1	0	0	0	0	0	0	0	0				0		-

=== Historical goalscoring record ===
The following record covers Ali Ashfaq's appearances from 2003 to 2013.

Rank	Nationality	Name	Club	Years	Goals	Apps	Ratio
1	(Maldives)	**Ali Ashfaq**	Club Valencia, New Radiant & VB Sports Club	2003–2013	181	151	1.20

=== Leading scorers by season, before 2015 ===
Season	Player	Nationality	Club	Goals	Games	Ratio
2000	Ali Umar	Maldives	Club Valencia			
2001	Ali Shiham	Maldives				
2002	Ali Shiham	Maldives				
2003	Ali Ashfaq	Maldives	Club Valencia	19	19	1
2004	Ali Ashfaq	Maldives	Club Valencia	20	11	1.818
2005	Ali Ashfaq	Maldives	Club Valencia	11	11	1
2009	Ali Ashfaq	Maldives	VB Sports Club	26	14	1.857
2010	Ali Ashfaq	Maldives	VB Sports Club	18	13	1.385
2012	Ali Ashfaq	Maldives	New Radiant SC	9		
2013	Ali Ashfaq	Maldives	New Radiant SC	31	18	1.722
2014	Assadhulla Abdulla	Maldives	Maziya S&RC	22		

== Clubs’ continental head-to-head records ==
Head-to-head records against clubs from 26 nations whom they have played to date only in AFC Competitions.

Against	Region	P	W	D	L	GF	GA	GD	%Win
Bangladesh	SAFF	22	7	2	13	26	53	−27	31.82
Bhutan	SAFF	4	3	1	0	7	1	+6	75.00
China	EAFF	4	0	1	3	1	21	−20	0.00
Hong Kong	EAFF	32	9	4	19	32	62	−30	28.13
India	WAFF	46	9	4	33	49	111	−62	19.57
Indonesia	AFF	20	6	3	11	33	32	+1	30.00
Iran	CAFA	2	0	0	2	0	17	−17	0.00
Japan	EAFF	7	0	1	6	0	47	−47	0.00
Jordan	WAFF	4	1	2	1	3	5	−2	25.00
Kuwait	WAFF	6	0	0	6	5	27	−22	0.00
Kyrgyzstan	WAFF	1	0	0	1	0	3	−3	0.00
Laos	AFF	2	1	1	0	3	2	+1	50.00
Lebanon	WAFF	2	0	0	2	3	6	−3	0.00
Malaysia	AFF	27	6	9	12	26	47	−21	22.22
Myanmar	AFF	8	2	2	4	9	14	−5	25.00
Nepal	SAFF	5	2	2	1	6	9	−3	40.00
Pakistan	SAFF	6	3	1	2	12	15	−3	50.00
Philippines	AFF	3	1	1	1	1	1	+0	33.33
Saudi Arabia	WAFF	2	0	0	2	3	8	−5	0.00
Singapore	AFF	28	5	2	21	22	68	−46	17.86
South Korea	EAFF	10	0	1	9	1	50	−49	0.00
Sri Lanka	SAFF	11	5	2	4	11	20	−9	45.45
Thailand	AFF	9	0	0	9	5	32	−27	0.00
Turkmenistan	CAFA	1	0	0	1	1	2	−1	0.00
Vietnam	AFF	16	1	1	14	13	45	−32	6.25
Yemen	WAFF	1	0	0	1	3	4	−1	0.00
Total	26 nations	279	61	40	178	275	702	−427	21.86

- Last Updated on 12 August 2025.

== See also ==
- Malé League
- List of football clubs in Maldives
