= Football Association of Maldives =

Governing body for football in the Maldives

AFC
- Short name: FAM
- Founded: 1 January 1982; 44 years ago
- Headquarters: Malé
- FIFA affiliation: 1 January 1986; 40 years ago
- AFC affiliation: 1984 (associate member); 1986
- SAFF affiliation: 1997
- President: Ahmed Thariq

The Football Association of Maldives (FAM), founded in 1982, is the governing body of football in the Maldives. The association under the guidance of the Ministry of Youth, Sports and Community Empowerment is responsible for all regulatory aspects of the sport in the Maldives. In 1986, FAM became a member of AFC and FIFA respectively.

== Organization ==
The FAM has an executive committee of five members under the president, in addition to a senior vice president, vice president and general secretary. It is located in the FAM House in Malé, which was constructed with funding from the FIFA "Goal" Project.

While FIFA and AFC required their members to constitute elected governance, FAM first had an appointed governance by the government of Maldives, which was reshuffled by the Ministry of Youth in the last quarter of 2006, in association with the political changes president Maumoon Abdul Gayoom brought about. FAM was audited by the Audit Office (during the same period, i.e. late 2006) of the Republic of Maldives and the association was accused with embezzlement of funds. However, the Chairman Abdul Shukoor was not dismissed and the General Secretary Ibrahim Ismail Ali was transferred to a post in the Olympic Committee of the Maldives.

In July 2008, elective governance was introduced to FAM and Ali Azim was elected President of the association. On 26 January 2013, FAM held its second election according to FIFA and AFC Statutes and Ilham Ahmed was elected as the President, and Mohamed Hanim as the General Secretary of FAM and subsequently appointed Hussain Jawaz as the General Secretary on 4 June 2014 upon Hanim's resignation. After a brief spell under the normalization committee appointed by FIFA on 2 December 2014, under the guidance of Mohamed Shaweed in May 2016, Ahmed Thariq was elected as the President and Bassam Adeel Jaleel was appointed as the general secretary. However, with the dismissal of general secretary Jaleel after three months, president Thariq was forced out of the office due to resignation of five executive members, followed by the reinstatement of Bassam due to unlawful statutory dismissal. Bassam contested with Thariq and was elected as the president on 20 November 2016, and Hussain Jawaz was appointed as the general secretary.

== Allegations of fraud ==
On 22 October 2023, Maldives Police Service raided the FAM house to investigate allegations of financial mismanagement and corruption on the orders of the Prosecutor General's Office. It was alleged that the association was misusing funds received by international federations, by transferring it to personal bank accounts. Police found out that the association had transferred funds it received in US dollars to a private company's bank account that belongs to an associate of the FAM's senior members.

In June 2024, the Independent Ethics Committee had suspended FAM's president Bassam Adeel Jaleel from taking any part in any football activity due to the allegations of money laundering, corruption, etc.

In July, the Bureau of the FIFA Council appointed a 'normalization committee' to address the dire governance and financial crisis of the association.

The hashtag '#SaveFAM' was trending on social media by a group of football officials and media officials to reinstate the Dhivehi Premier League. Some also called the association as 'going rogue'.

FIFA officials had also called the association as 'the worst-run football association'.

== Role and events ==
FAM is the governing body for football in the Maldives. It organizes the Dhivehi Premier League, the Maldives FA Cup, the FAM Women's Football Championship, and the Cup Winners Cup (formerly). Maldivian football is divided into 3 divisions, in which the 1st consists of 10 clubs. The number of clubs in the 2nd and 3rd division has been quite inconsistent, and so has been the method and relegation rules. In December 2014 the Dhivehi League was reformed as the Dhivehi Premier League.

== See also ==
- Maldives women's national football team
- Maldives national futsal team
- Football in the Maldives
- Maldives Football Awards
