= Club Eagles =

Maldivian sports club

- Full name: Club Eagles
- Nickname: The Eagles
- Founded: 22 June 1989; 37 years ago
- Ground: Rasmee Dhandu Stadium
- Capacity: 11,850
- Chairman: Fathimath Suadh
- Manager: Abdulla Haneef
- League: Dhivehi Premier League
- 2025-26: DPL, 5th of 10

Club Eagles, formerly known as Eagles Malé, is a sports club based in Malé, Maldives. It is best known for its football team. The team were promoted to Dhivehi League in 2006 and relegated back to the Second Division the next season. They were again promoted to the top division in 2011, after several years.

== History ==
Club Eagles was founded on 22 June 1989 and was promoted to the top flight Dhivehi League in 2006.

After a preliminary round win against Thimphu City on AFC Cup debut in April 2021, on 15 August, they faced Indian side Bengaluru FC in the qualifying play-offs, but lost the game 1–0.

== Continental record ==
Season	Competition	Round	Opponent	Home	Away	Aggregate
2021	AFC Cup	Preliminary round 1	(Bhutan) Thimphu City	2–0		
2021	AFC Cup	Play-off round	(India) Bengaluru	0–1		

== Players ==
=== Current squad ===
As of September 2026

Note: Flags indicate national team as defined under FIFA eligibility rules; some limited exceptions apply. Players may hold more than one non-FIFA nationality.

No.	Pos.	Nation	Player
1	GK	PAK	Saqib Hanif
2	DF	MDV	Daniyal Mohamed Didi
3	DF	MDV	Gasim Samaam
4	FW	MDV	Abdulla Zuhaan Hassan Mohamed
5	MF	MDV	Inaan Ahmed
6	FW	EGY	Amir Shoeib Elsadek Mohamed
7	FW	MDV	Mohamed Jailam
8	MF	MDV	Zayan Naseer
9	MF	MDV	Abdulla Sameeh Moosa
10	MF	MDV	Ismail Easa
11	MF	MDV	Zain Zafar
12	MF	MDV	Naavy Mohamed
13	DF	MDV	Shaihan Faiz
14	FW	MDV	Abdulla Ahil Ali

No.	Pos.	Nation	Player
15	DF	MDV	Yaish Mohamed Nasir
16	MF	MDV	Ansar Ibrahim
17	MF	MDV	Musannif Mohamed
18	FW	MDV	Salim Mohamed
19	DF	MDV	Mohamed Farhaan
20	DF	MDV	Ahnaf Rasheed
21	MF	MDV	Ahmed Laith Abbas
22	FW	LBR	Van-Dave Gbowea Harmon
23	FW	MDV	Aakif Bin Mohamed
24	GK	MDV	Arushan Abdulla
25	DF	MDV	Abdulla Shayaan Shafeeu
26	DF	MDV	Mohamed Ajufaan
27	DF	MDV	Vishah Abdul Majeed
30	MF	MDV	Mohamed Shamhaan
31	GK	MDV	Yanaal Muneez
32	MF	MDV	Vishaan Abdul Majeed
33	DF	MNE	Marko Ivanovic
40	FW	MDV	Hassan Azoomu Ali
47	DF	MDV	Thaaiu Abdul Hakeem
50	DF	MDV	Ali Ishfaaq Hassan Majeed
