= Club Green Streets =

- Full name: Club Green Streets
- Nicknames: Green, Green Dragons
- Founded: 7 October 2010; 15 years ago
- Stadium: National Football Stadium
- Capacity: 11,850
- President: Muaviyath Khaleel
- Head Coach: Ali Nisthar Mohamed
- League: Dhivehi Premier League
- 2025–26: 8
Home colours	Away colours

Club Green Streets is a professional football club based in Malé, Maldives that competes in the Dhivehi Premier League, the top flight of Maldivian football. The club was founded in 2010, starting in the third division, and earned promotion to the 2nd division as the runners up in 2012. They later earned promotion to the first division in 2016 after an unbeaten season. The club and its head coach Sobah Mohamed has mutually decided to continue their journey further by taking on the club's latest and biggest challenge since its inception.

The club was established in the hopes of uniting the youth of Machangolhi through the power of football. It is still the club's main goal to provide positions within the club to as many local youngsters and to promote and develop young talents while providing them a platform to showcase their abilities. Club Green Streets Academy will kick-off in 2017 as part of this objective, to scout for hidden talents and to develop and nurture these athletes for the betterment of the game and future of football in the country.

== History ==
Registered with 70 members in 2010, Club Green Streets has enjoyed the privilege of increasing the size of the club in terms of membership, with over 400 registered members, becoming strongest local clubs in the capital city of Maldives. Club Green Streets was registered as a recreational sports club for the youth of Machangolhi. The club participated in other sports such as basketball, futsal and baibalaa.

=== Relegation controversy ===
On the final day of the 2025–26 Dhivehi Premier League season, Green Streets failed to fulfill their fixture against New Radiant, resulting in a 2–0 forfeit loss. The result allowed the club to avoid relegation on goal difference, as a loss by four or more goals would have seen them drop below Club Valencia into the relegation zone. Following the match, Valencia accused Green Streets of match-fixing and petitioned the FAM, AFC, and FIFA. The Football Association of Maldives (FAM) subsequently fined Green Streets 50,000 rufiyaa and imposed a transfer ban, though the result was upheld. The club denied the allegations, stating the no-show was caused by a viral outbreak of flu and diarrhea within the squad.

== Players ==
=== Current Squad ===
As of 19 September 2025 Note: Flags indicate national team as defined under FIFA eligibility rules; some limited exceptions apply. Players may hold more than one non-FIFA nationality.

No.	Pos.	Nation	Player
1	MF	MDV	Mohamed Taha
2	MF	MDV	Adam Samakh
3	MF	MDV	Abdulla Ruwaid
4	FW	UZB	Shukurali Pulatov
5	DF	MDV	Ahmed Assadh
6	MF	MDV	Ahmed Nahil Ibrahim
7	MF	MDV	Mohamed Jailam
8	MF	MDV	Rilwan Waheed
10	FW	MDV	Mohamed Raif Fazeel
11	MF	MDV	Ahmed Samah
12	MF	MDV	Ibrahim Ilhan Ismail
13	MF	MDV	Hassan Fawaaz
14	DF	MDV	Aalaaf
15	FW	MDV	Ismail Mifaau Mohamed

No.	Pos.	Nation	Player
16	MF	MDV	Areen Abdulla Ibrahim
17	MF	MDV	Abdulla Misbah
19	MF	MDV	Mohamed Farhaan
20	MF	MDV	Mohamed Rishfan
21	MF	MDV	Hussain Abdulla
22	MF	MDV	Ibrahim Haseeb
23	GK	MDV	Ibrahim Hamid
24	MF	MDV	Yanaal Muneez
25	DF	MDV	Obaida Kadhim Ahmed
29	DF	MDV	Sajid Abdulla Yameen
30	GK	MDV	Ahmed Rameez
32	DF	MDV	Mifzaal Idrees
33	MF	MDV	ElSayed Mahmoud

== Coaching staff ==
Position	Staff
Manager	(Maldives) Ahmed Aan Abbas
Head Coach	(Maldives) Ali Nisthar Mohamed
Assistant Coach	(Maldives) Ismail Asif
Assistant Coach	(Sri Lanka) Hamdhulla Fernando
Assistant Coach	(Maldives) Yoosuf Rameez
Assistant Coach	(Maldives) Ahmed Jailam
Goalkeeper Coach	(Maldives) Mausoom Haleem
Mecical officer	(India) Anit Aqulina Daisy Michael John
Staff	(Maldives) Ahmed Hisham Mohamed

== Notable players ==
- Rilwan Waheed

== Honours ==
- FAM Second Division
  - Champions (1): 2016
  - Runners-up (1): 2015
  - Third place (1): 2013
- FAM Third Division
  - Runners-up (1): 2012
