= List of Churchill Brothers FC Goa managers =

This is a list of Churchill Brothers Sporting Club's managers (head coaches) and their records, from 2007, when the first professional manager was appointed, to the present day.

== Coaching list ==
Information correct as of 1 October 2012. Only competitive matches are counted. Wins, losses and draws are results at the final whistle; the results of penalty shoot-outs are not counted.

Picture	Name	Nationality	From	To	P	W	D	L	GF	GA	Win%	Honours
	Karim Bencherifa	Morocco	August 2006	May 2008	36	18	11	7	30	23	50.00	
	Zoran Đorđević	Serbia	June 2008	May 2009	22	13	7	2	53	23	59.09	1 I-League
	Carlos Roberto Pereira	Brazil	August 2009	May 2010	26	11	10	5	50	35	42.31	1 Durand Cup, 1 IFA Shield
	Vincent Subramaniam	Singapore	2 July 2010	14 March 2011	19	11	6	2	42	29	57.89	
	Drago Mamić	Serbia	14 March 2011	1 June 2011	7	3	2	2	15	12	42.86	1 IFA Shield
	Manuel Gomes	Portugal	9 June 2011	20 February 2012	19	10	4	5	30	19	52.63	1 Durand Cup
	Carlos Roberto Pereira	Brazil	1 March 2012	7 May 2012	7	4	2	1	17	9	57.14	
	Mariano Dias	India	13 July 2012	23 June 2014	59	29	15	15	102	67	49.15	1 I-League,1Federation Cup
	Alfred Fernandes	India	23 July 2014	17 February 2017	0	0	0	0	0	0	—	
	Derrick Pereira	India	17 February 2017	17 May 2017	0	0	0	0	0	0	—	
	Mykola Shevchenko	Ukraine	13 July 2017	17 December 2017	5	0	0	5	0	0	0.00	
	Petre Gigiu	Romania	13 August 2018	28 May 2019	20	9	7	4	35	23	45.00	
	Bernardo Tavares	Portugal	28 November 2019	10 March 2020	15	6	2	7	23	21	40.00	
	Fernando Santiago Varela	Spain	23 September 2020	27 March 2021	15	8	5	2	22	17	53.33	
	Petre Gigiu	Romania	18 June 2021	13 January 2022	1	0	0	1	0	1	0.00	

Key
* Served as caretaker manager.
