= Ali Ashfaq =

Maldivian footballer (born 1985)

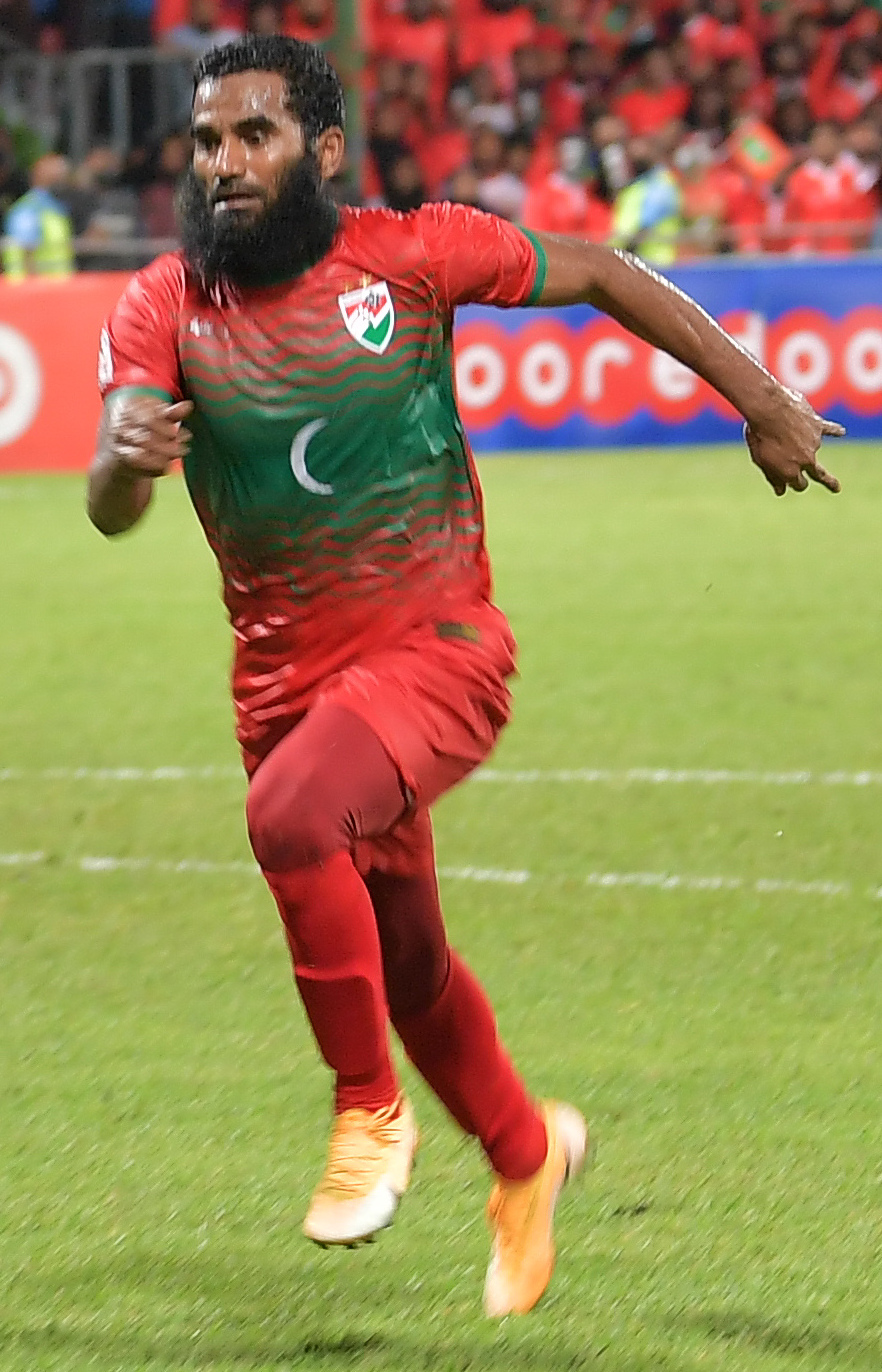
- Ashfaq with the Maldives in 2021

Personal information
- Date of birth: 6 September 1985 (age 41)
- Place of birth: Malé, Maldives
- Height: 1.78 m (5 ft 10 in)
- Position: Forward

Team information
- Current team: New Radiant
- Number: 7

Senior career*
Years	Team	Apps	(Gls)
2001–2005	Club Valencia	55	(61)
2006–2007	New Radiant	22	(16)
2007–2008	DPMM	7	(2)
2008–2011	VB	49	(61)
2012–2013	New Radiant	36	(52)
2014–2016	PDRM	47	(31)
2016	Maziya S&RC	10	(6)
2017–2018	New Radiant	14	(13)
2018	TC	16	(22)
2019–2020	Green Streets	6	(8)
2020	TC	11	(12)
2020–2021	Club Valencia	9	(5)
2022	Club Eagles	0	(0)
2023–2024	Super United Sports	0	(0)
2025–	New Radiant	4	(4)

International career^{‡}
2006–2010	Maldives U23	7	(2)
2003–	Maldives	101	(58)
Medal record
Maldives
South Asian Games
Bronze medal – third place	2010 Bangladesh	U23 Team
SAFF Championship
Winner	2008 Maldives & Sri Lanka	Senior Team
Runner-up	2009 Bangladesh	Senior Team
AFC Challenge Cup
Third place	2014 Maldives	Senior Team
- * Club domestic league appearances and goals ‡ National team caps and goals as of 4 June 2026 (UTC)

Ali Ashfaq (Dhivehi: އަލީ އަޝްފާގު; born 6 September 1985) is a Maldivian professional footballer who plays as a forward for New Radiant and the Maldives national team. Nicknamed "Man of Steel" (Dhivehi: ދަގަނޑޭ, romanized: Dhagandey), he is regarded as one of the best players in the South Asian region, and the literal undisputed greatest Maldivian footballer of all time. In fact, in 2013, he had the second-highest recorded goals in the world, only below Cristiano Ronaldo A prolific and individualistic goalscorer, he is a free-kick specialist and a clinical finisher. His trademark style of scoring is beating the defenders and rounding off the keeper to score. He is considered as the best Maldivian footballer ever, most notably when he was named as the "World's 2nd best top goal scorer" in 2013 by IFFHS, and the "AFC best goal-scorer of XXI century" after 2023, with 476 top-level goals. He is the player with most pokers scored in XXI Century. He was also named as South Asia's Best Player in 2014 by a sports website called eultimate goal.

He is the first Maldivian footballer to play abroad, and the only player to win a title with a foreign club. In November 2003, Ashfaq was honored with the most prestigious awards a Maldivian footballer would get, in the age of 18 – Maldivian Footballer of the Year and Golden Boot Award in 2003 season. With Club Valencia, New Radiant, VB Sports Club and PDRM FA, he has won the Dhivehi League ten times, six Maldives FA Cups, four President's Cups, two Maldives Cup Winners' Cups, three Maldivian Charity Shields, two POMIS Cups and one Malaysia Premier League.

Ashfaq began his career with Club Valencia, where he played for five years. In 2001, he won his first trophy, Dhivehi League. He was crowned as the top scorer of Maldivian football season between 2003 and 2005 consecutively. In 2006, he signed for New Radiant and won several trophies, and he was named as Haveeru Best Footballer of the year in 2007. Ashfaq moved to Brunei's DPMM FC in October 2007, and he joined VB Sports Club after two months and stayed with them until 2011. He re-joined New Radiant in 2012, where he won all the domestic cups with in 2013 before moving to PDRM FA in 2014. In November 2014, Ashfaq won the Best Import Player Award in the Malaysia National Football Awards, for his outstanding performances during the season.

Ashfaq made his successes international debut for Maldives in December 2003 at the age of 18. He has since been capped over 100 times, and is Maldives' all-time top scorer with 58 goals. He scored his first international goal in the 2006 FIFA World Cup qualifiers. In 2008, he won the Most Valuable Player award in 2008 SAFF Championship. He was among the Top 10 Players of Asia in 2008 and 2009. He also was shortlisted among the Top 10 Players to watch by ESPN in 2012. In May 2014, Ashfaq won his first medal as the captain of Maldives as they finished third in the 2014 AFC Challenge Cup. On 31 December 2015, Ashfaq concluded his last SAFF tournament from the semi-finals, remaining as the all-time top scorer of the SAFF Suzuki Cup with 20 goals. In March 2016, Ashfaq scored his 50th goal for Maldives.

== Early life ==
Ashfaq was born in Malé, the capital of Maldives, where he grew up with his mother and older brother Ahmed Ashfan. He reputedly showed a keen interest in football since a very young age, and preferred playing football to attending school. He was the captain Majeediyya School football team when they played in the Inter school Football Tournament those years. The local football team, Club Valencia, took an interest in him, and in 2001 joined Valencia and thus started his professional football career.

== Club career ==
=== Club Valencia ===
==== 2001–02: Beginning of club career ====
On 26 October 2001, Ashfaq played his very first match in 2001 POMIS Cup tournament against Thailand's BEC Tero Sasana FC, wearing the Club Valencia jersey for the very first time. Ashfaq got the opportunity in POMIS Cup, due to the three match suspension faced by Ali Umar. In that match, he created a wonderful chance to score a goal as he edged past two defenders and goalkeeper, but he left for Ali Shiham to score. Ashfaq scored his first goal for the club after beating the veteran sweeper Kappi and his powerless shot went into the left corner of the net in the second match of POMIS Cup as Valencia beat Victory Sports Club 1–0 on 30 October. In the semi-final, Ashfaq assisted Ali Shiham to score Valencia's first goal against FC Kochin of India. Valencia won the match by 2–0.

On 8 June 2002, Ashfaq netted his first goal of the season on their 5–0 win against Eagles. Ashfaq played his first international club tournament against Mohun Bagan of India in 2002–03 AFC Champions League qualification on 9 October 2002. In the first leg in Kolkata, Ashfaq leveled the game when Valenica was 2–1 down.

On 21 August 2002, the youngster claimed his first hat-trick against Veymandoo Zuvaanunge Gulhun. Ashfaq managed to score 12 goals in his first full season for Valencia.

==== 2003–05: Best player award and top scorer for three consecutive years ====
In the 2003 season at Club Valencia with 36 goals by his side he ended the season with the Best Player of the Season Award.

On 6 April 2004, Ashfaq played his very first match in an AFC Cup tournament against Hong Kong's Happy Valley AA, scored both goals in a 2–1 win. However, Happy Valley won the second leg 3–1 on 21 April, Ashfaq scoring Valencia's goal.

He was the top scorer for three consecutive seasons, scoring 37 goals in 2004 and 34 in 2005. By the age of 20, he had scored 110 goals for Valencia.

=== New Radiant ===
For the 2006 season, Ashfaq joined New Radiant, who finished third place in the 2005 AFC Cup the previous year. In a team that included other notable players like Ibrahim Fazeel, Ali Umar, Sobah Mohamed and Ahmed Thoriq, Ashfaq could not maintain his high goal-scoring rate, and lost the Golden Boot to his teammate Fazeel. But he managed to score more than 40 goals during his time with the New Radiant. He played remarkably well and helped the Blues win many titles.

=== Brunei DPMM ===
In October 2007, Ashfaq moved to Brunei DPMM FC on a two-month contract, which competed in the Malaysia Super League. On 18 November, Ashfaq made his debut against Perak FA in the leagues. Ashfaq scored his first goal in their win over Negeri Sembilan by 5–1 win on 21 November. In January 2008, after 7 appearances in DPMM, he was transferred to the Maldivian VB Sports Club for a transfer fee of €13000. The Brunei side tried their best to hold the Maldivian striker but he chose to return to his homeland.

=== VB ===
He joined VB Sports Club, and became the captain. In his first season, he couldn't manage to show his best potential. But in the second season with VB, he returned to the stage, scoring 33 goals for the club, and played a major role in winning VB their first ever league title. In 2009, he was named Best Player of the Maldives for the third time, as well as top scorer. In 2010 season, due to numerous suspensions and injuries, he missed a big part of the season, but still managed to score 30 goals. It was the first year VB won the President's Cup. In the final, Ashfaq scored four goals in the 5–3 win over the local rivals Victory SC.all together he scored 464 goals in his carear

Ashfaq kicked off 2011 season with two goals in the Milo Charity Shield game against Victory on 13 February. Their first victory of the season came on 30 March, in Dhivehi League against New Radiant by 3–1, which Ashfaq managed to score once in the match. On 7 April, he scored a hat-trick against Club Eagles on their 9–0 win in the league. VB were the champions of 2011 Dhivehi League with 47 points while he scored 14 goals in the league. On 11 May, Ashfaq scored his only goal of 2011 AFC Cup against Sông Lam Nghệ An in Vietnam. VB didn't advance to the knock-out stage of the tournament that year. In FA Cup final, Ashfaq netted four times to help VB win the championship after beating Maziya by 6–4 on 31 October. In 2011 season, he scored 22 goals.

For his impressive performance throughout the season, Haveeru named Ashfaq as Maldivian footballer of the year, while he also received 2nd best player of the season award from the Football Association of Maldives.

==== Controversies ====
From mid-2010 there were rumors that Ashfaq was having problems with VB Sports Club, and had started to miss practice sessions. The rumors were not believed until 25 February 2011, when VB announced that Ashfaq had been stripped of the captaincy only a few days after the club had won the Milo Charity Shield. Ashfaq said, "After yesterday's practice I was informed that I am no longer the captain. Don't know the reason now. But after the last season, I suggested the club to give the armband to someone else. I told them I have been wearing it for the last three seasons and believed it's time for someone else to take the responsibility. But the club refused at that time and told that I should keep the band".

Ashfaq then went missing shortly before the team went to Indonesia for the 2011 AFC Cup opener against Sriwijaya F.C., and the club failed to locate him before their departure. According to Haveeru news, Ashfaq said later that his reason for not going was that he considered the club to have restricted his rights.

=== Return to New Radiant ===
==== 2012 season ====
Ashfaq rejoined New Radiant on 19 December 2011, after being released by VB Sports Club. In season 2012, New Radiant faced VB in the first game of the league and Ashfaq managed to score a hat-trick against his former club. Ashfaq helped New Radiant win the league and qualify for the 2013 AFC Cup.

New Radiant also won the President's Cup title after beating Victory Sports Club on penalty shoot-out. Ashfaq netted just one goal in President's Cup, and he totally scored 22 goals for New Radiant in 2012.

==== 2013: New Radiant's Invincibles ====
Ashfaq had a challenging, impressive but also one of the successful season with New Radiant in 2013. Ashfaq's first goal of the many came on his first game of the season. He scored the opener from the spot in the FA Charity Shield victory over Maziya by 3–1. On 5 March, New Radiant played Sun Hei SC of Hong Kong in the 2013 AFC Cup. Mohamed Umair scored the only goal for New Radiant from a good ball delivered by Ashfaq. New Radiant packed three points in home and departed to Indonesia on 12 March, for their second match in AFC Cup against Persibo Bojonegoro. Ashfaq scored five times against the Indonesian side.

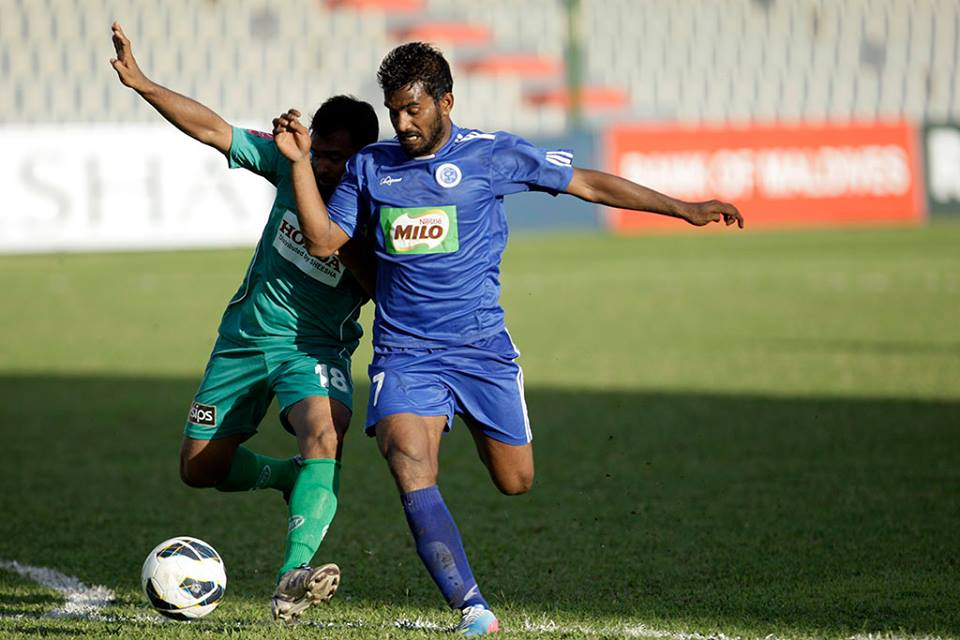
Ashfaq with New Radiant challenging a Maziya player

On 1 May, Ashfaq scored a hat-trick against Persibo at home. He also scored his 300th career goal in the 80th minute from the spot in the same match. Ashfaq has managed to score in every AFC Cup that he participated, since 2004, becoming the top scorer of Maldives in the competition, also becoming the first Maldivian player to score five goals in two consecutive AFC Cup tournament. New Radiant beat Malaysia's Selangor by 2–0 in the extra time and qualified to the Round of 16. New Radiant was knocked out of the tournament after losing to the champions of 2012 AFC Cup, Kuwait SC from both legs in an aggregate of 12–2. Ashfaq scored 1 out of 2 goals against Kuwait SC after penetrating the defense line in the first leg in home.

New Radiant announced just before the President's Cup final that the club has decided not to renew the contract with Ashfaq as he wanted to play for a foreign club in 2014. For the last game of Ashfaq before departing to Malaysia's PDRM FA, many supporters were present at the National Stadium to bid farewell for the national captain. Ashfaq scored one last goal for New Radiant in the final minutes of the game. Maziya was defeated by a score of 4–2. Throughout the season, Ashfaq scored remarkable 44 goals for the blues and won the best player and top scorer award in that year. New Radiant finished the season with a 100% winning record.

=== PDRM ===
==== 2014: MPL Champions and Best Foreign Player in Malaysia ====
"I am really thankful to the management of the club for the trust on me and giving the chance to stay with them for another two years. It was the best offer for me and my career, so I decided to stay with them." – Ashfaq told to media after renewing his contract with PDRM FA

On 10 December 2013, Ashfaq scored his first unofficial goal for PDRM FA in a friendly match against Penjara, where the match ended with 2–0 for PDRM. He made his official debut on 21 January in Malaysia FA Cup against KL Spa, scored his first goal for PDRM. On 27 January, Ashfaq scored his first goal in Malaysia Premier League against Penang while PDRM beat them by 7–1. On 14 February, he scored his first hat-trick in the league against Perlis. His second hat-trick in the league came on 28 March against Kedah. PDRM released Ashfaq on 19 April to participate in AFC Challenge Cup with Maldives national football team. He returned to Malaysia to join the club on 31 May. He missed two league matches.

On 20 June 2014, Ashfaq won the 2014 Malaysia Premier League with PDRM and became the first ever Maldivian player to win a title abroad. He scored 17 goals for PDRM in 20 matches in the league. In the Malaysia Cup as he scored twice against the Super League side, Sime Darby in their first match in the tournament. On 20 August, PDRM surprisingly won the second game of the group stage against Malaysian football giants, Selangor in a score-line of 2–0 while Ashfaq scored broke the deadlock from the spot for a foul on him. Ashfaq netted thrice in the last two games against T-Team in the group stage of Malaysia Cup and helped PDRM to finish the group at the top. PDRM were knocked out of the tournament after losing to Pahang on aggregate score of 3–2 in Malaysia Cup quarter-finals.

On 13 November, Ashfaq won the "Best Import Player Award" in 2014 FA Malaysia Football Awards. He scored 27 goals from 30 matches in his first year in Malaysia. Ashfaq renewed his contract with PDRM for two years on 20 November.

==== 2015–16 Top 3 Best Foreign Players in Malaysia & final half-year ====
In January 2015, PDRM travelled to Maldives for an invitation from Maldives FA to play in the 2015 POMIS Cup. PDRM played their first game in POMIS Cup against Ashfaq's previous club, New Radiant, and won the match 1–0. PDRM reached the final, winning 5–4 after beating Maziya in extra time with a hat-trick from Ashfaq. In the FA Cup Round of 32, Ashfaq broke the deadlock against Sabah in a 3–0 win, advancing to the last 16. Ashfaq suffered a hamstring injury in his right leg while playing against Perak on 14 March, returning on 11 April and scoring a goal against Felda United.

On 18 April, PDRM won against Sime Darby by 4–1 and Ashfaq netted twice in Selayang. He scored the only goal for PDRM against Selangor which ended as 1–1 draw. Ashfaq got injured after Selangor game and missed the matches against Sarawak and Terengganu due to injury. Ashfaq scored the last goal of the season for PDRM in their win against ATM on 22 August. Ashfaq scored 10 goals in 17 matches in the league. Ashfaq scored 3 goals in 6 matches in Malaysia Cup against Pahang, Penang and PKNS FC in Group D. PDRM knocked out from group stage of the tournament. On 14 December 2015, Ashfaq was nominated for the Best Foreign Player Award in Malaysia Football Awards 2015.

PDRM announced that Ashfaq will stay with them for 2016 season – the final year of his contract with the club which made on 2014 for two years on 17 December 2015. On 13 February 2016, Ashfaq scored the only goal for PDRM to win their opening game of the season against Sarawak by 1–0. His final game for the club came against Kedah at home; the game finished by 1–1 on 21 May. On 24 May, Ashfaq announced that he and PDRM had come to an mutual understanding to terminate his contract with 7 months remaining, due to an injury suffered.

=== Maziya ===
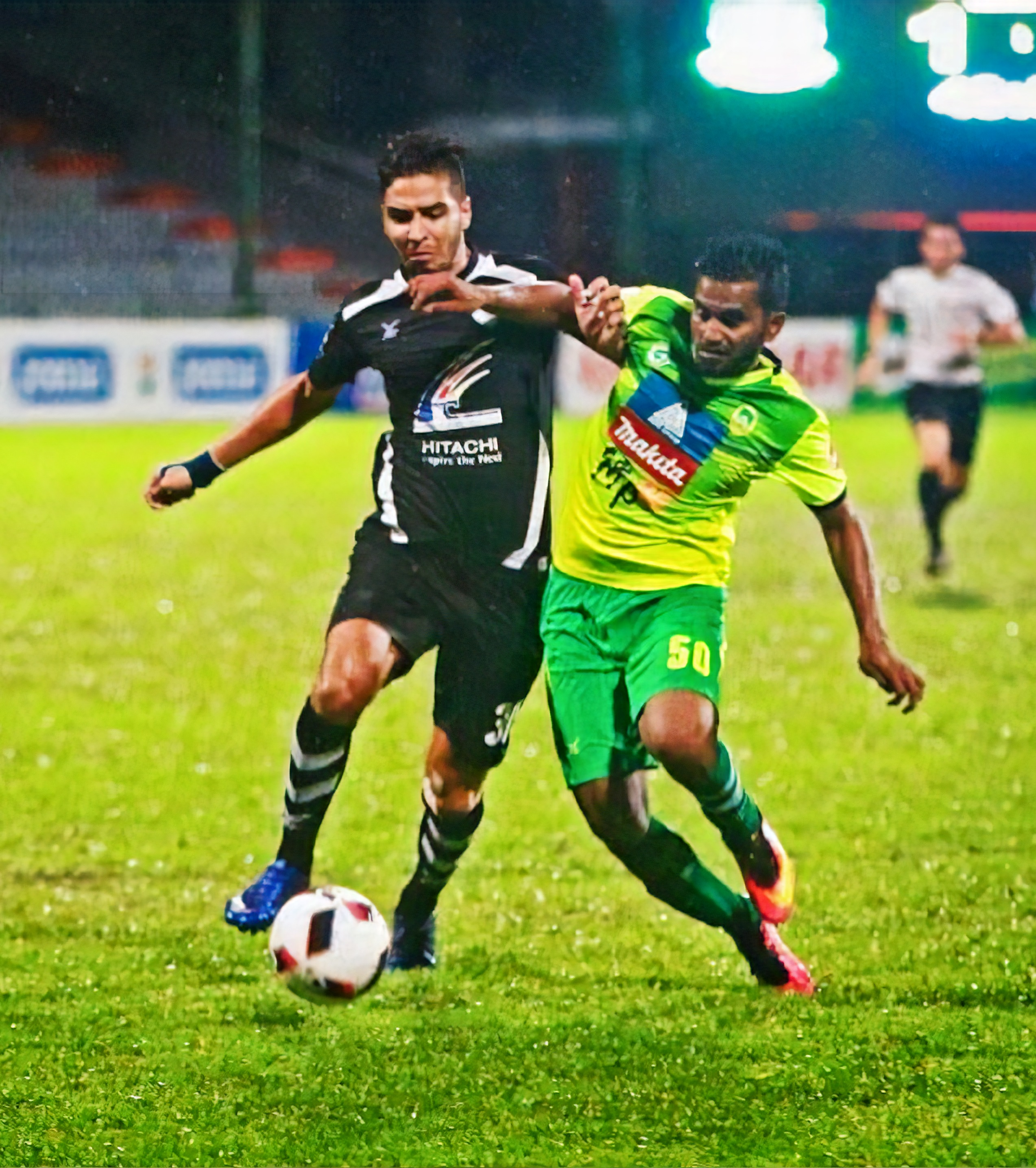
Mohamed Magdy Elhusseiny defending the ball from Ashfaq of Maziya in the Dhivehi League

Ashfaq signed the contract with Maziya on a 4-month deal on 12 July 2016 and made his debut against BG Sports in Dhivehi Premier League on 20 July. Ashfaq scored his first goal for Maziya against New Radiant on 7 August.

== International career ==
Ashfaq started his international career in 2004 being part of the Maldives senior national team.

=== 2005–11 SAFF Championship glory and captaincy ===
Ashfaq lost his place for the 2003 SAFF Championship National Squad to his fellow national team striker Ahmed Thariq. Ashfaq's first SAFF Championship was the 2005 SAFF Championship in Karachi. He managed to score two goals against Afghanistan and one against Sri Lanka in the group stage. Maldives were knocked out by India in the semi-final.

Maldives and Sri Lanka co-hosted 2008 SAFF Championship, in which Maldives won their first ever SAFF Championship title. Despite his goalless run throughout the tournament, Ashfaq assisted six goals for the side and was named Most Valuable Player of the tournament. As a result, he was included in the list of Goal's Asia's top ten performers of 2008.

Ashfaq became the captain of Maldives national football team at the age of 23, in 2009. During the 2009 SAFF Championship, Ashfaq scored three goals. Maldives lost the title to India in the final after penalties. Ashfaq was the runner-up to Most Valuable Player of the tournament and but was voted the best player of the tournament by the Bangladeshi media.

The 2011 SAFF Championship was hosted by India, and all the matches took place in New Delhi. The Maldivian side went to the tournament with high hopes after replacing their Argentine coach Diego Cruciani with their previous 2009 coach István Urbányi. Maldives with Pakistan, Nepal and Bangladesh was placed in what was called the Group of Death. Maldives' first match was against Nepal. In the final minutes of the first half, Ashfaq scored with an brilliant world-class long range shot, which was also praised by the international media as the best goal of the tournament. The match ended in a draw. The Maldives–Pakistan match also concluded as a draw, but was criticized for an average performance. Maldives were knocked out in the semifinal by the eventual winners, India.

=== 2013: Record breaking year ===
Maldives played their first friendly match of 2013 against Pakistan in which the Maldivian drew by 1–1. However, in the second match Maldives won by 3 goals, with two coming from Ashfaq. His first goal was the most notable as he dribbled past 3 defenders and the goal keeper as well.

In the 2013 SAFF Championship held in Nepal, Ashfaq scored 6 goals against Sri Lanka. Maldives won the match by 10–0, breaking their own record of winning with the biggest margin set in a 9–1 win against Afghanistan in 2005. Moreover, Ashfaq set himself another record by being the all-time top scorer of SAFF Championship with 14 goals in total. He continued his fantastic form and scored 4 in the 8–2 thumping of Bhutan. With this, Ashfaq has 18 goals in the SAFF Championship.

=== 2014–16: First ever AFC medal and last SAFF Championship ===
In the opening match of the 2014 AFC Challenge Cup against Myanmar, Ashfaq set up Mohamed Umair for a goal and scored the final goal himself in a 3–2 defeat. He continued his fine form with two goals in a 2–0 win over Kyrgyzstan. In the last match of the group stage, Maldives drew 0–0 with Palestine and secured a place from semi-final. Even with the greatest skill of Ashfaq, Maldives lost to Philippines by 3–2 in extra time and had to play third place play-off. Maldives and Afghanistan fought for the third place until the 120 minutes of the game which ended as 1–1. Maldives beat Afghanistan on penalty shoot-out by 8–7 and won the first ever medal from an AFC tournament.

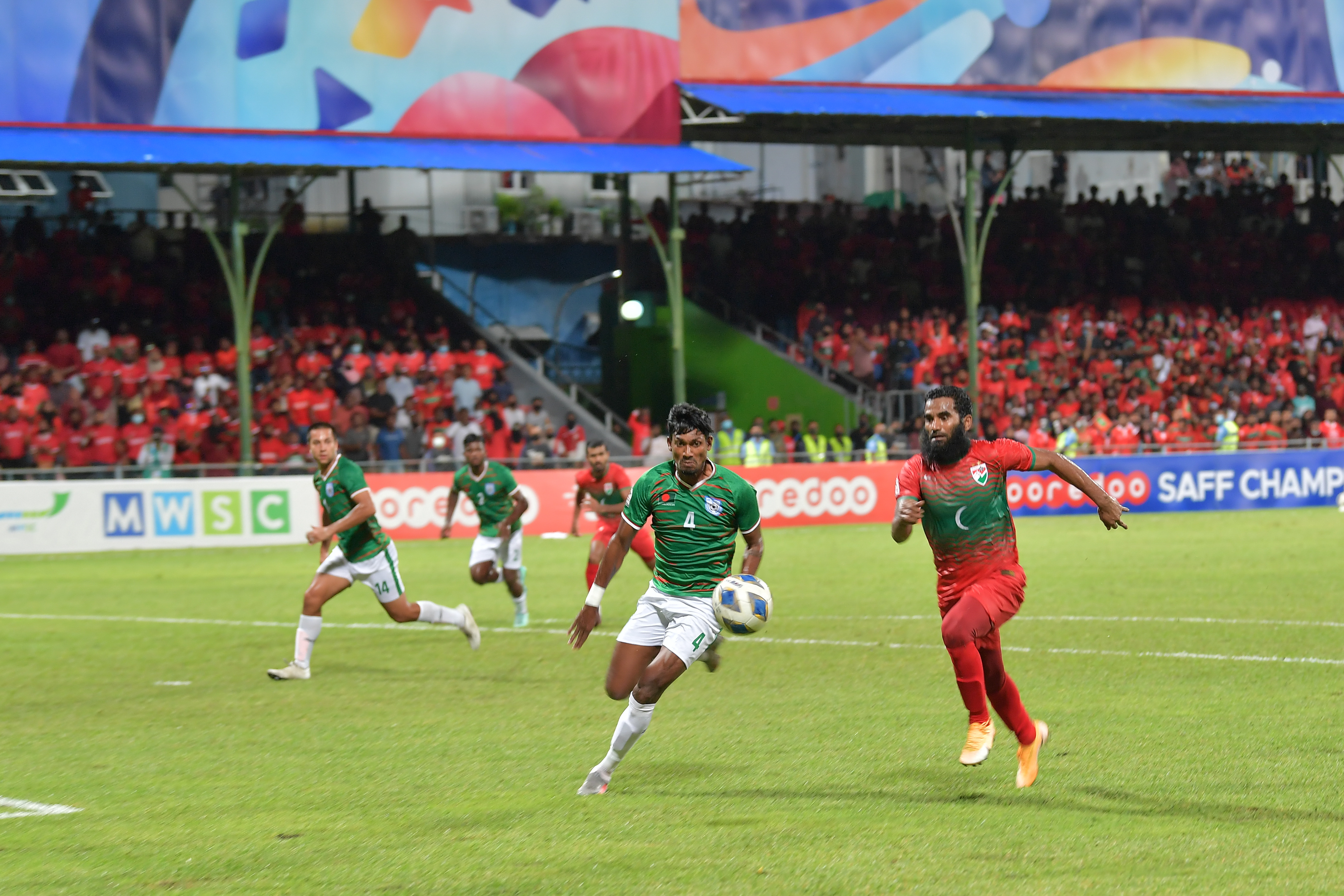
Ashfaq (on right) against Bangladesh at the 2021 SAFF Championship.

Maldives played Tajikistan on 26 March 2015. Ashfaq was sidelined as he was recovering from a hamstring injury he sustained in Malaysia Super League. Tajikistan beat Maldives by 2–0 at National team. In Manila, on 3 September 2015, Maldives was beaten by Philippines in a friendly game which ended as 2–0. FAM gave rest to Ashfaq on this match because he had to play competitive matches too tightly in Malaysia Super League.

Maldives were grouped alongside Qatar, China, Hong Kong and Bhutan in Group C in the 2018 FIFA World Cup Qualification (AFC) round 2. On 11 June 2015, Maldives played Qatar at home and were narrowly defeated through a 99th-minute goal by 1–0. Later on 16 June, Maldives lost to Hong Kong by 2–0 away at home. Both of the matches, he was not in a good form. Ashfaq could not participate in the China game due to some personal reasons, which Maldives lost to China in a 4–0 score-line in Shenyang. On 8 October, Ashfaq scored a hat-trick against Bhutan in their home and came off the pitch on 59th minute which ended as 4–3 to Maldives. Maldives lost their home game against Hong Kong by one goal on 12 November.

On 26 November 2015, Ashfaq announced that the 2015 SAFF Championship would be his last edition of the tournament before his retirement from international football. Maldives camped in Malaysia to prepare for the SAFF Championship, and played several matches during the camp, including against Ashfaq's club, PDRM FA. On 24 December, Maldives faced Bhutan in their first game, winning 3–1 with Ashfaq scoring a stunner after beating couple of defenders outside the area. In the second game of the group stage against Bangladesh, Maldives won narrowly by a 3–1 score line after scoring two goals during the late minutes of the game. Ashfaq scored a penalty against Bangladesh on 26 December.

=== 2026: 100th cap ===
After being absent from the national team since 21 March 2023 due to injury, Ashfaq was called up to the 2026 Diamond Jubilee International Football Tournament where he earned his 100th cap as a substitute during the 1–0 loss against Afghanistan on 1 June 2026.

== Style of play ==
From a tactical standpoint, Ashfaq usually plays in a free attacking role, most often as a striker, and is capable of attacking on either wing or through the centre of the pitch. He is frequently cited as "South Asia's best attacking player", as well as the best Maldivian footballer ever, and is known for his dribbling ability, agility, speed, skills on the ball, and his powerful, accurate, and clinical shooting, as well as his passing accuracy. He is predominantly a left footed player, although he is also able to control the ball and finish well with his right foot. He is also a free-kick specialist.

A prolific goalscorer, he is known as an individualistic attacker.

== Outside football ==
=== Philanthropy ===
On 15 August 2014, Ashfaq donated one of his football boots to support the Palestine Relief Fund set by Maldivian Red Crescent. His boot was auctioned to raise funds to help the people in Palestine.

=== Commercial endorsements ===
In January 2013, Milo unveiled Ashfaq as their brand ambassador in Maldives. According to Milo, under the ambassadorship program he will feature in the advertisements of Milo in the Maldives. These include TV commercials, billboards, posters and road shows and events conducted by Milo.

In May 2013, the Maldives Olympic Committee appointed Ashfaq as their sports ambassador. He also received Maldives government's green passport as he became the ambassador of Maldives Olympic Committee. "This is a great success, an honor. I will work with the government and sports associations to improve and promote the Maldives sports sector. I would like to thank senior members of the Olympic committee for this great honor. I am very pleased." – Ashfaq said to media.

Ashfaq became the brand ambassador for State Trading Organization's local brand "Noo-Fahi" for two years in August 2014. Zott Yoghurt appointed Ashfaq as their ambassador in Maldives in 2014.

In March 2016, Ooredoo Maldives unveiled Ashfaq as their brand ambassador for one year.

== Career statistics ==
=== Club ===
Club statistics
Club	Season	League			Cup (Note: Includes the Maldives FA Cup and Piala Malaysia)		League Cup (Note: Includes the President's Cup and Malaysia Cup)		Asia		Other (Note: Includes the FA Charity Shield, Cup Winners' Cup and POMIS Cup)		Total	
Club	Season	Division	Apps	Goals	Apps	Goals	Apps	Goals	Apps	Goals	Apps	Goals	Apps	Goals
Valencia	2001	Dhivehi League	—		—		—		—		4 (Note: All appearances in POMIS Cup)	1	4	1
Valencia	2002	Dhivehi League	14	11	0	0	2	0	2 (Note: All appearances in AFC Champions League Qualification)	1	5 (Note: one appearance in FA Charity Shield, four appearances in Cup Winners' Cup)	0	23	12
Valencia	2003	Dhivehi League	19	19	4	3	0	0	—		6 (Note: one appearance in FA Charity Shield, four appearances in Cup Winners' Cup, four appearances in POMIS Cup)	9 (Note: two goals in Cup Winners' Cup, seven goals in POMIS Cup)	29	31
Valencia	2004	Dhivehi League	11	20	3	4	1	0	6 (Note: All appearances in AFC Cup)	3	1 (Note: one appearance in FA Charity Shield, two appearances in Cup Winners' Cup)	3 (Note: All goals in Cup Winners' Cup)	22	30
Valencia	2005	Dhivehi League	11	11	3	4	0	0	6	1	11	14	31	30
Valencia	Total		55	61	10	11	3	0	14	5	27	27	109	104
New Radiant	2006	Dhivehi League	11	7	3	1	2	0	6	1	12 (Note: seven appearances in Dhivehi League qualification, five appearances in Cup Winners' Cup)	6 (Note: one goal in Dhivehi League qualification, five goals in Cup Winners' Cup)	34	15
New Radiant	2007	Dhivehi League	11	9	3	3	1	1	6	1	4	1	25	15
New Radiant	Total		22	16	6	4	3	1	12	2	16	7	59	30
DPMM	2007–08	Malaysia Super League	7	2	—		—		—		—		7	2
VB	2008	Dhivehi League	9	3	3	1	2	0			—		14	4
VB	2009	Dhivehi League	14	26	3	7	3	1	6	1	1 (Note: Appearance in FA Charity Shield)	1	27	36
VB	2010	Dhivehi League	13	18	2	1	3	7	6	5	1	0	25	31
VB	2011	Dhivehi League	13	14	2	4	—		3	2	1	2	19	22
VB	Total		49	61	10	13	8	8	15	8	3	3	85	93
New Radiant	2012	Dhivehi League	18	21	1	0	2	1	—		—		21	22
New Radiant	2013	Dhivehi League	18	31	2	0	2	3	7	9	1	1	30	44
New Radiant	Total		36	52	3	0	4	4	7	9	1	1	51	66
PDRM	2014	Malaysia Premier League	20	17	4	1	6	6	—		—		30	24
PDRM	2015	Malaysia Super League	17	10	1	1	6	3	—		4	3	28	17
PDRM	2016	Malaysia Super League	11	5	4	0	—		—		—		15	5
PDRM	Total		48	32	9	2	12	9	—		4	3	73	46
Maziya	2016	Dhivehi Premier League	10	6	—		2	2	—		—		12	8
New Radiant	2017	Dhivehi Premier League	14	13	3	0	2	0	—		—		19	13
TC	2018	Dhivehi Premier League	16	22	0	0	0	0	—		0	0	16	22
Green Streets	2019–20	Dhivehi Premier League	9	8									9	8
TC	2019–20	Dhivehi Premier League	11	12					1	0			12	12
Valencia	2020–21	Dhivehi Premier League	9	5									9	5
Eagles	2022	Dhivehi Premier League	0	0									0	0
SUS	2023	Dhivehi Premier League	0	0			?	3 (Note: Ali Ashfaq scored 3 goals in 2023 President's Cup.)					?	3
SUS	2024	Dhivehi Premier League	—											
New Radiant	2025–26	Dhivehi Premier League	2	3	—		—		—		—		2	3
New Radiant	2026-27	Dhivehi Premier League	2	1									2	1
Career total			290	294	41	30	34+	27	49+	29 (Note: Ali Ashfaq scored 29 goals in his 10 AFC Competitions.)	51	41	465	421

=== International ===
As of match played 4 June 2026

Appearances and goals by national team and year
National team	Year	Apps	Goals
Maldives	2003	3	4
Maldives	2004	8	2
Maldives	2005	4	3
Maldives	2006	0	0
Maldives	2007	2	1
Maldives	2008	7	0
Maldives	2009	8	7
Maldives	2010	1	0
Maldives	2011	16	6
Maldives	2012	6	1
Maldives	2013	7	14
Maldives	2014	6 (Note: Ashfaq featured in one unofficial match against Laos in 2014, which is not recognized by FIFA but is counted by the Football Association of Maldives.)	5
Maldives	2015	9	5
Maldives	2016	3	4
Maldives	2017	2	0
Maldives	2018	0	0
Maldives	2019	4	2
Maldives	2020	0	0
Maldives	2021	9	4
Maldives	2022	2	0
Maldives	2023	1	0
Maldives	2024	0	0
Maldives	2025	0	0
Maldives	2026	3	0
Total		101	58

== Honours ==
Maldives

- SAFF Championship: 2008

PDRM

- Malaysia Premier League: 2014
- POMIS Cup: 2015

New Radiant

- Maldivian FA Charity Shield: 2013
- Dhivehi League: 2006, 2012, 2013
- FA Cup: 2006, 2007, 2013
- President's Cup: 2007, 2012, 2013

VB

- Maldivian FA Charity Shield: 2010, 2011
- Dhivehi League: 2009, 2010, 2011
- FA Cup: 2008, 2011
- President's Cup: 2010

Club Valencia

- Dhivehi League: 2001, 2002, 2003, 2004
- FA Cup: 2004
- Cup Winners' Cup: 2004, 2005
- POMIS Cup: 2001

Individual

- FAM Appreciation Award for scoring 50 goals for National Team: 2016
- Maldives National Youth Award: 2014
- www.eutimategoal.com's Best Player of South Asia: 2014
- Malaysia's Best Import Player of the Year: 2014
- Top 3 Import Players in Malaysia: 2015
- Haveeru Special Award for becoming the World's 2nd Best Top Goal Scorer of the Year: 2013
- IFFHS World's 2nd Best International Scorer: 2013 (23 goals)
- SAFF Championship Dream Team: 2013
- All-time Top Scorer of SAFF Championship: 2021 (23 goals)
- New Radiant SC's Supporters Player of the Year: 2013
- New Radiant SC's Excellence Award: 2013
- New Radiant SC's Best Goal of the Season: 2013 (against Persibo of Indonesia in AFC Cup)
- New Radiant SC's Best Player of the Season: 2013
- Bangladeshi Media's SAFF Championship Player of the Year: 2009
- Fans' Favorite Player of South Asia: 2009
- Top 10 Asian Players of the Year: 2008, 2009
- Most Valuable Player of SAFF Championship: 2008
- Top Scorer of SAFF Championship: 2005, 2013
- FAM Best Player of the Year: 2004, 2009, 2011 (2nd place), 2013
- Haveeru Golden Boot: 2003, 2004, 2005, 2008, 2009, 2010, 2013
- Haveeru Maldivian Player of the Year: 2003, 2007, 2009, 2011, 2013
- Maldivian Top Scorer of the Season: 2003, 2004, 2005, 2008, 2009, 2010, 2013

Records

- Maldivian all-time top scorer: 464 goals
- All-time top scorer for Maldives national team: 57 goals
- Maldivian all-time top scorer in AFC Cup: 23 goals
- First Maldivian player to score a double hat-trick in an international match: 6 goals (2013 SAFF Championship: Maldives 10–0 Sri Lanka)
- First Maldivian player to score a hat-trick in AFC Cup
- Only Maldivian player to win the Most Valuable Player of SAFF Championship: 2008
- First and only Maldivian player to win a tournament with a foreign club: 2014 Malaysia Premier League with PDRM FA
- Only Maldivian player to win the best player award in abroad: 2014 (Best foreign player in Malaysia)
- Youngest player to score for senior Maldives national team: 18 years
- Youngest player to score a hat-trick for senior Maldives national team: 4 goals at the age of 18 years (against Mongolia in 2003)

== See also ==
- List of top international men's football goalscorers by country
- List of men's footballers with 100 or more international caps
- List of men's footballers with 50 or more international goals
- List of international goals scored by Ali Ashfaq
