= Keith Jennings =

Keith Jennings may refer to:

- Keith Jennings (footballer) (born 1977), Bermudian international soccer player
- Keith Jennings (basketball) (born 1968), American basketball coach and former basketball player
- Keith Jennings (cricketer) (1953–2024), English cricketer
- Keith Jennings (American football) (born 1966), former American football tight end
- Keith R. Jennings (born 1932), British chemist
- Keith Jennings (tennis), American former tennis player, 1966 U.S. National Championships – Men's Singles
