= Sunday Seah =

Liberian footballer

Personal information
- Full name: Sunday Mickelson Seah
- Date of birth: January 7, 1978 (age 48)
- Place of birth: Monrovia, Liberia
- Height: 1.88 m (6 ft 2 in)
- Position: Goalkeeper

Youth career
- Georgia FC

Senior career*
Years	Team	Apps	(Gls)
1999–2001	FC Kochin	19	(0)
2001–2003	Salgaocar SC Goa	41	(0)
2003–2004	Dempo SC	21	(0)
2004–2005	Persmin Minahasa	15	(0)
2006	PSIM Yogyakarta	18	(0)
2007–2008	Persiwa Wamena	34	(0)
2009	LISCR FC	15	(0)
2010	Delta United	12	(0)
2011	LISCR FC	18	(0)
2011	UMC Roots FC	20	(0)
2012–2013	Persip Pekalongan	28	(0)

International career
1997–2011	Liberia	14	(0)
- * Club domestic league appearances and goals

Sunday Seah (born January 7, 1978) is a Liberian former professional footballer who played as a goalkeeper.

== Club career ==
Born in Monrovia, Seah began playing club football with local side Junior Professional at age 13. He played as a goalkeeper and a striker in India for FC Kochin. From 1999 to 2001, he appeared in the National Football League (India) with the Elephants, where he scored 8 goals in 19 league matches. With Kochin, he won the National Football League in 1999.

In 2001, he moved to another Indian club Salgaocar SC, where he played until 2003 and appeared in 41 league matches, scoring 20 goals. He was in Salgaocar's 2002–03 National Football League Runners-up squad.

Seah signed with Indian giants Dempo SC in 2003 and appeared in only a season before moving to Indonesian outfit Persmin Minahasa in 2004. With Dempo, he lifted the Federation Cup trophy in 2004. During his days in India, he was one of the best in business when it came to scoring goals.

He also played for clubs like PSIM Yogyakarta of Liga 2 (Indonesia), Persiwa Wamena of Liga 3 (Indonesia) and then he finally moved to his home country and joined LISCR FC in 2009.

== International career ==
Seah made his senior international debut for Liberia national team in a 1998 FIFA World Cup qualification match against Namibia on 8 June 1997, which ended as their 2–1 defeat.

Between 1997 and 2011, he represented Liberia in both the World Cup and African Cup of Nations qualifiers, appearing in a total of 14 matches.

== Honors ==
FC Kochin

- Kerala State Football League: 1999

Salgaocar

- National Football League runner-up: 2002–03

Dempo SC

- Federation Cup: 2004

== See also ==
- Liberia men's international footballers
