= Pewou Bestman =

Liberian footballer

Personal information
- Full name: Pewou Bestman
- Date of birth: July 10, 1975 (age 51)
- Place of birth: Liberia
- Height: 1.90 m (6 ft 3 in)
- Position: Goalkeeper

Senior career*
Years	Team	Apps	(Gls)
1995–1996	Invincible Eleven		
2000–2001	Invincible Eleven		
2001–2002	FC Kochin		
2002	Invincible Eleven		

International career
1988–2002	Liberia		
- * Club domestic league appearances and goals as of 13:42, 08 December 2007 (UTC)

Pewou Bestman (born July 10, 1975) is a Liberian retired footballer who played as a goalkeeper for the Liberia national team from 1988 to 2002.
