= Josiah Seton =

Liberian footballer

Personal information
- Full name: Josiah B. Seton
- Date of birth: 23 March 1979 (age 47)
- Place of birth: Monrovia, Liberia
- Height: 1.75 m (5 ft 9 in)
- Position: Striker

Senior career*
Years	Team	Apps	(Gls)
2000–2001	Invincible Eleven		
2001–2002	FC Kochin	18	(6)
2002–2005	Sabah FA	76	(35)
2005	Thunder Bay Chill	15	(12)
2005–2006	Pahang FA	24	(12)
2007–2009	Bontang PKT	70	(24)
2009	Thunder Bay Chill	3	(0)
2009–2015	PPSM Sakti Magelang	88	(32)

International career
2003–2006	Liberia	5	(1)
- * Club domestic league appearances and goals

Josiah Seton (born 23 March 1979) is a retired Liberian footballer who played as a striker. He is a member of the Liberia national football team.

Seton previously played for Sabah FA in Malaysia. He joined Indian NFL club FC Kochin in 2001.
