= T. K. Chathunni =

Indian footballer and coach (1944 or 1945 2024)

Personal information
- Date of birth: 1944 or 1945
- Place of birth: Chalakudy, Kingdom of Cochin, British India (present day Thrissur, Kerala, India)
- Date of death: 12 June 2024 (aged 80)
- Place of death: Karukutty, Ernakulam, Kerala, India
- Position: Defender

Senior career*
Years	Team	Apps	(Gls)
- EME Centre
- Vasco
- Orkay Mills Mumbai

Managerial career
- Kochin
- Dempo
- Salgaocar
- Mohun Bagan
- Churchill Brothers
- Chirag United Club Kerala
- Josco
- * Club domestic league appearances and goals

T. K. Chathunni (1944 or 1945 – 12 June 2024) was an Indian football coach and a player from Chalakudy, Kerala.

== Playing career ==
A defender, Chathunni played for Kerala and Goa.

== Coaching career ==
Chathunni managed most football clubs in India like Kochin, Dempo, Salgaocar, Mohun Bagan, Churchill Brothers, Chirag United Club Kerala, Josco and others. He was the coach for various clubs in the National Football League from 1997–98. He represented both Kerala and Goa in the Santosh Trophy.

== Death ==
Chathunni died on 12 June 2024, at Appolo Adlux hospital in Karukutty, Ernakulam succumbing to cancer. He was 80.

== Honours ==
=== Manager ===
Salgaocar

- Federation Cup: 1997

Mohun Bagan

- National Football League: 1997–98
