= List of international goals scored by Ali Ashfaq =

Ali Ashfaq is the top goalscorer of all time for the Maldives national football team, with 58 goals in 101 appearances since his debut in 2003.

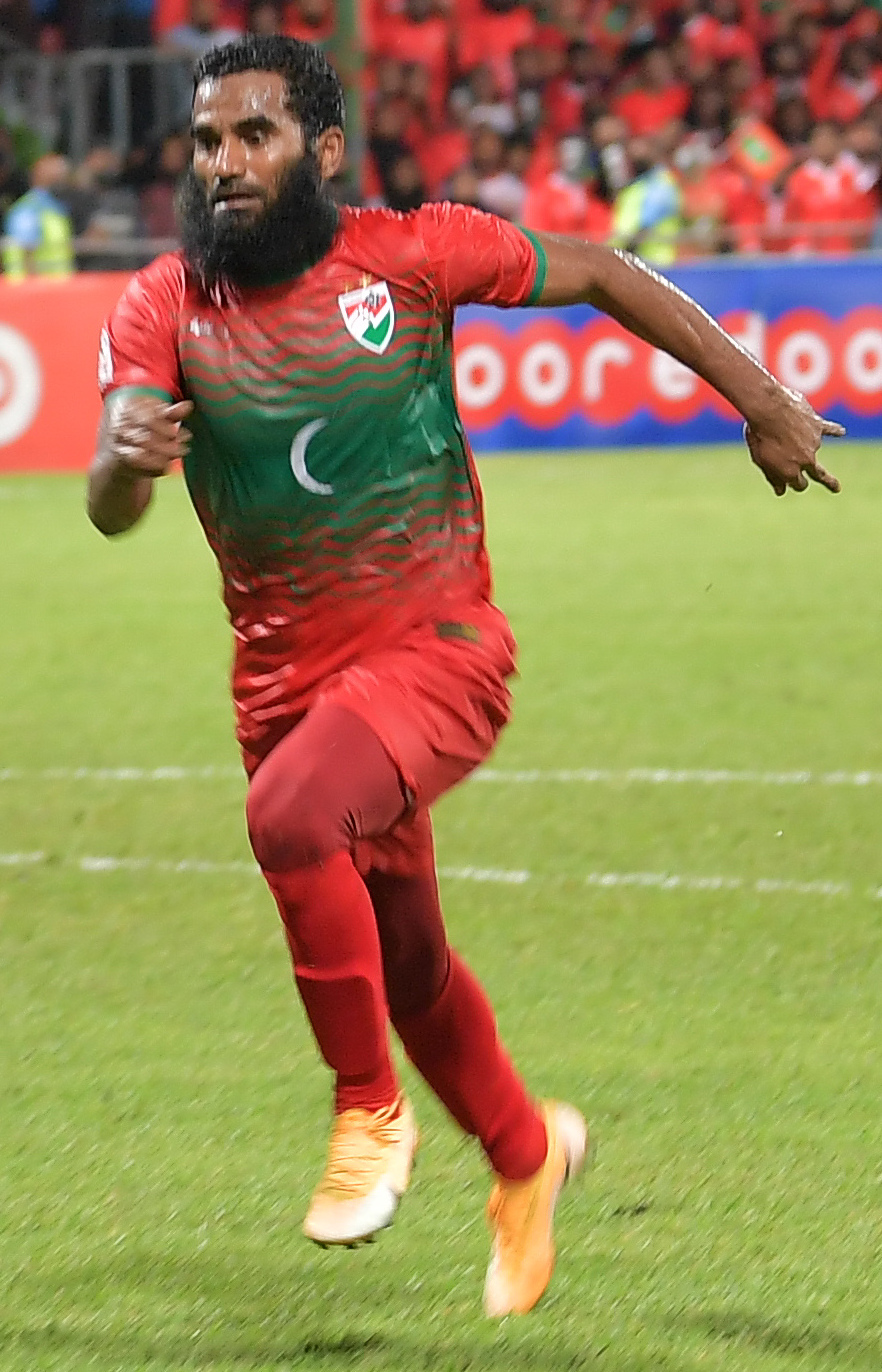
Ali Ashfaq, the all-time top scorer for Maldives.

On 3 December 2003, Ashfaq scored his debut goal, yet his first hat-trick for Maldives against Mongolia in 2006 FIFA World Cup qualifier. In September 2013, Ashfaq netted six times against Sri Lanka in 2013 SAFF Championship, thus becoming the only player ever for Maldives to score a double hat-trick. In the same tournament, he netted four goals against Bhutan and became the all-time top scorer of SAFF Championship with 23 goals, surpassing the record previously held by India's Bhaichung Bhutia.

== International goals ==
Scores and results list Maldives' goal tally first, score column indicates score after each Ashfaq goal

List of international goals scored by Ali Ashfaq
No.	Cap	Date	Venue	Opponent	Score	Result	Competition	Ref.
1	3	3 December 2003	National Football Stadium, Malé, Maldives	Mongolia	1–0	12–0	2006 FIFA World Cup qualification	
2	3	3 December 2003	National Football Stadium, Malé, Maldives	Mongolia	5–0	12–0	2006 FIFA World Cup qualification	
3	3	3 December 2003	National Football Stadium, Malé, Maldives	Mongolia	6–0	12–0	2006 FIFA World Cup qualification	
4	3	3 December 2003	National Football Stadium, Malé, Maldives	Mongolia	8–0	12–0	2006 FIFA World Cup qualification	
5	9	13 October 2004	National Football Stadium, Malé, Maldives	Vietnam	2–0	3–0	2006 FIFA World Cup qualification	
6	9	13 October 2004	National Football Stadium, Malé, Maldives	Vietnam	3–0	3–0	2006 FIFA World Cup qualification	
7	12	7 December 2005	People's Football Stadium, Karachi, Pakistan	Afghanistan	3–0	9–1	2005 SAFF Gold Cup	
8	12	7 December 2005	People's Football Stadium, Karachi, Pakistan	Afghanistan	9–1	9–1	2005 SAFF Gold Cup	
9	13	9 December 2005	People's Football Stadium, Karachi, Pakistan	Sri Lanka	1–0	2–0	2005 SAFF Gold Cup	
10	17	28 October 2007	National Football Stadium, Malé, Maldives	Yemen	2–0	2–0	2010 FIFA World Cup qualification	
11	27	16 April 2009	National Football Stadium, Malé, Maldives	Philippines	2–1	3–2	2010 AFC Challenge Cup qualification	
12	28	18 April 2009	National Football Stadium, Malé, Maldives	Bhutan	1–0	5–0	2010 AFC Challenge Cup qualification	
13	28	18 April 2009	National Football Stadium, Malé, Maldives	Bhutan	2–0	5–0	2010 AFC Challenge Cup qualification	
14	29	26 November 2009	Kuala Lumpur, Malaysia	Malaysia	1–0	1–0	Friendly	
15	31	7 December 2009	Bangabandhu National Stadium, Dhaka, Bangladesh	Afghanistan	2–1	3–1	2009 SAFF Championship	
16	31	7 December 2009	Bangabandhu National Stadium, Dhaka, Bangladesh	Afghanistan	3–1	3–1	2009 SAFF Championship	
17	32	11 December 2009	Bangabandhu National Stadium, Dhaka, Bangladesh	Sri Lanka	3–1	5–1	2009 SAFF Championship	
18	34	21 March 2011	National Football Stadium, Malé, Maldives	Cambodia	2–0	4–0	2012 AFC Challenge Cup qualification	
19	34	21 March 2011	National Football Stadium, Malé, Maldives	Cambodia	3–0	4–0	2012 AFC Challenge Cup qualification	
20	34	21 March 2011	National Football Stadium, Malé, Maldives	Cambodia	4–0	4–0	2012 AFC Challenge Cup qualification	
21	44	22 November 2011	National Football Stadium, Malé, Maldives	Seychelles	3–0	3–0	Friendly	
22	46	2 December 2011	Jawaharlal Nehru Stadium, New Delhi, India	Nepal	1–0	1–1	2011 SAFF Championship	
23	48	6 December 2011	Jawaharlal Nehru Stadium, New Delhi, India	Bangladesh	3–1	3–1	2011 SAFF Championship	
24	54	27 August 2012	Jawaharlal Nehru Stadium, New Delhi, India	Syria	1–0	2–1	Friendly	
25	57	14 February 2013	National Football Stadium, Malé, Maldives	Pakistan	2–0	3–0	Friendly	
26	57	14 February 2013	National Football Stadium, Malé, Maldives	Pakistan	3–0	3–0	Friendly	
27	58	2 September 2013	Dasharath Rangasala, Kathmandu, Nepal	Sri Lanka	2–0	10–0	2013 SAFF Championship	
28	58	2 September 2013	Dasharath Rangasala, Kathmandu, Nepal	Sri Lanka	3–0	10–0	2013 SAFF Championship	
29	58	2 September 2013	Dasharath Rangasala, Kathmandu, Nepal	Sri Lanka	4–0	10–0	2013 SAFF Championship	
30	58	2 September 2013	Dasharath Rangasala, Kathmandu, Nepal	Sri Lanka	5–0	10–0	2013 SAFF Championship	
31	58	2 September 2013	Dasharath Rangasala, Kathmandu, Nepal	Sri Lanka	6–0	10–0	2013 SAFF Championship	
32	58	2 September 2013	Dasharath Rangasala, Kathmandu, Nepal	Sri Lanka	10–0	10–0	2013 SAFF Championship	
33	59	4 September 2013	Dasharath Rangasala, Kathmandu, Nepal	Bhutan	3–2	8–2	2013 SAFF Championship	
34	59	4 September 2013	Dasharath Rangasala, Kathmandu, Nepal	Bhutan	4–2	8–2	2013 SAFF Championship	
35	59	4 September 2013	Dasharath Rangasala, Kathmandu, Nepal	Bhutan	6–2	8–2	2013 SAFF Championship	
36	59	4 September 2013	Dasharath Rangasala, Kathmandu, Nepal	Bhutan	7–2	8–2	2013 SAFF Championship	
37	61	27 November 2013	Stade Linité, Victoria, Seychelles	Seychelles	1–1	1–3	Friendly	
38	62	29 November 2013	Stade Linité, Victoria, Seychelles	Seychelles	1–1	1–2	Friendly	
39	63	13 May 2014	National Football Stadium, Malé, Maldives	Laos	3–1	7–1	Friendly	
40	63	13 May 2014	National Football Stadium, Malé, Maldives	Laos	4–1	7–1	Friendly	
41	64	19 May 2014	National Football Stadium, Malé, Maldives	Myanmar	2–3	2–3	2014 AFC Challenge Cup	
42	65	21 May 2014	National Football Stadium, Malé, Maldives	Kyrgyzstan	1–0	2–0	2014 AFC Challenge Cup	
43	65	21 May 2014	National Football Stadium, Malé, Maldives	Kyrgyzstan	2–0	2–0	2014 AFC Challenge Cup	
44	71	8 October 2015	Changlimithang Stadium, Thimphu, Bhutan	Bhutan	2–0	4–3	2018 FIFA World Cup qualification	
45	71	8 October 2015	Changlimithang Stadium, Thimphu, Bhutan	Bhutan	3–0	4–3	2018 FIFA World Cup qualification	
46	71	8 October 2015	Changlimithang Stadium, Thimphu, Bhutan	Bhutan	4–0	4–3	2018 FIFA World Cup qualification	
47	74	24 December 2015	Trivandrum International Stadium, Thiruvananthapuram, India	Bhutan	3–1	3–1	2015 SAFF Championship	
48	75	26 December 2015	Trivandrum International Stadium, Thiruvananthapuram, India	Bangladesh	1–0	3–1	2015 SAFF Championship	
49	78	29 March 2016	National Football Stadium, Malé, Maldives	Bhutan	2–2	4–2	2018 FIFA World Cup qualification	
50	78	29 March 2016	National Football Stadium, Malé, Maldives	Bhutan	4–2	4–2	2018 FIFA World Cup qualification	
51	80	6 September 2016	National Football Stadium, Malé, Maldives	Laos	2–0	4–0	2019 AFC Asian Cup qualification	
52	80	6 September 2016	National Football Stadium, Malé, Maldives	Laos	4–0	4–0	2019 AFC Asian Cup qualification	
53	84	10 October 2019	Rashid Stadium, Dubai, United Arab Emirates	Syria	1–2	1–2	2022 FIFA World Cup qualification	
54	86	19 November 2019	National Football Stadium, Malé, Maldives	Guam	3–1	3–1	2022 FIFA World Cup qualification	
55	90	7 October 2021	National Football Stadium, Malé, Maldives	Bangladesh	2–0	2–0	2021 SAFF Championship	
56	91	10 October 2021	National Football Stadium, Malé, Maldives	Sri Lanka	1–0	1–0	2021 SAFF Championship	
57	92	13 October 2021	National Football Stadium, Malé, Maldives	India	1–1	1–3	2021 SAFF Championship	
58	93	9 November 2021	Colombo Racecourse, Colombo, Sri Lanka	Sri Lanka	4–0	4–4	Friendly	

== Hat-tricks ==
No.	Date	Venue	Opponent	Goals	Result	Competition	Ref.
1	3 December 2003	National Football Stadium, Malé, Maldives	Mongolia	4 – (4', 61', 63', 68')	12–0	2006 FIFA World Cup qualification	
2	21 March 2011	National Football Stadium, Malé, Maldives	Cambodia	3 – (41', 84', 88')	4–0	2012 AFC Challenge Cup qualification	
3	2 September 2013	Dasharath Rangasala, Kathmandu, Nepal	Sri Lanka	6 – (21' pen., 46' pen., 51', 53', 58', 87')	10–0	2013 SAFF Championship	
4	4 September 2013	Dasharath Rangasala, Kathmandu, Nepal	Bhutan	4 – (48', 51', 76', 79')	8–2	2013 SAFF Championship	
5	8 October 2015	Changlimithang Stadium, Thimphu, Bhutan	Bhutan	3 – (23', 33', 57' pen.)	4–3	2018 FIFA World Cup qualification	

== Statistics ==
Appearances and goals by year
National team	Year	Apps	Goals
Maldives	2003	3	4
Maldives	2004	8	2
Maldives	2005	4	3
Maldives	2007	2	1
Maldives	2008	7	0
Maldives	2009	8	7
Maldives	2010	1	0
Maldives	2011	16	6
Maldives	2012	6	1
Maldives	2013	7	14
Maldives	2014	6	5
Maldives	2015	9	5
Maldives	2016	3	4
Maldives	2017	2	0
Maldives	2019	4	2
Maldives	2021	9	4
Maldives	2022	2	0
Maldives	2023	1	0
Maldives	2026	3	0
Total		101	58

Goals by competition
Competition	Goals
AFC Challenge Cup qualification	6
AFC Asian Cup qualification	2
FIFA World Cup qualification	14
Friendlies	10
SAFF Championship	23
AFC Challenge Cup	3
Total	58

Goals by opponent
Opponent	Goals
Bhutan	12
Sri Lanka	10
Afghanistan	4
Laos	4
Mongolia	4
Bangladesh	3
Cambodia	3
Seychelles	3
Kyrgyzstan	2
Pakistan	2
Syria	2
Vietnam	2
Guam	1
India	1
Malaysia	1
Myanmar	1
Nepal	1
Philippines	1
Yemen	1
Total	58
