= 2001 POMIS Cup =

Tournament details
- Host country: Maldives
- Dates: 26 October – 6 November
- Teams: 6
- Venue(s): 1 (in 1 host city)

The 2001 POMIS Cup was the 15th POMIS cup, an international soccer club tournament held in Maldives. The group stage started on 26 October 2001, and the final was played on 6 November 2001 at the Rasmee Dhandu Stadium, Malé, Maldives.

== Teams ==
Below are the top four teams of the 2001 Dhivehi League and two invited foreign clubs.

=== Teams and Nation ===
Note: Table lists clubs in alphabetical order.

Team	Nation
BEC Tero Sasana	Thailand
Club Valencia	Maldives
FC Kochin	India
Hurriyya SC	Maldives
Island FC	Maldives
Victory Sports Club	Maldives

== Group stage ==
=== Group A ===
Pos	Team	Pld	W	D	L	GF	GA	GD	Pts
1	Club Valencia	2	2	0	0	4	1	+3	6
2	Victory Sports Club	2	1	0	1	2	2	0	3
3	BEC Tero Sasana	2	0	0	2	2	5	-3	0

26 October 2001	Club Valencia	3–1	BEC Tero Sasana	Rasmee Dhandu Stadium, Malé

28 October 2001	Victory Sports Club	2–1	BEC Tero Sasana	Rasmee Dhandu Stadium, Malé

30 October 2001	Victory Sports Club	0–1	Club Valencia	Rasmee Dhandu Stadium, Malé

=== Group B ===
Pos	Team	Pld	W	D	L	GF	GA	GD	Pts
1	Island FC	2	2	0	0	4	0	+4	6
2	FC Kochin	2	1	0	1	2	3	-1	3
3	Hurriyya SC	2	0	0	2	0	3	-3	0

27 October 2001	Hurriyya SC	0–2	FC Kochin	Rasmee Dhandu Stadium, Malé

29 October 2001	Island FC	3–0	FC Kochin	Rasmee Dhandu Stadium, Malé

31 October 2001	Island FC	1–0	Hurriyya SC	Rasmee Dhandu Stadium, Malé

=== Semi finals ===
2 November 2001	FC Kochin	0–2	Club Valencia	Rasmee Dhandu Stadium, Malé

3 November 2001	Victory Sports Club	3–0	Island FC	Rasmee Dhandu Stadium, Malé

=== Final ===
6 November 2001	Club Valencia	1–0	Victory Sports Club	Rasmee Dhandu Stadium, Malé
