= Mohamed Magdy Elhusseiny =

Egyptian footballer (born 1989)

Mohamed Magdy
Personal information
- Full name: Mohamed Magdy Elhusseiny Mahmoud
- Date of birth: 23 April 1989 (age 37)
- Place of birth: Giza, Egypt
- Height: 1.85 m (6 ft 1 in)
- Position: Midfielder

Team information
- Current team: Burgan SC
- Number: 14

Youth career
- 2005–2007: ENPPI SC
- 2007–2010: El Shams Club

Senior career*
Years	Team	Apps	(Gls)
2010–2011	El Dakhleya SC	10	(5)
2011–2012	ENPPI SC	15	(7)
2013–2014	Muktijoddha Sangsad KC	17	(4)
2014–2015	Lynx F.C.	22	(8)
2015–2018	Club Eagles	43	(11)
2018–2019	Burgan SC	10	(4)
- * Club domestic league appearances and goals

Mohamed Magdy Elhusseiny Mahmoud (Arabic: محمد مجدي الحسيني محمود; born 23 April 1989) is an Egyptian professional footballer who plays as a midfielder for Burgan SC in Kuwait Federation Cup.

== International Club Career ==
Mohamed Magdy. started his career in the Egyptian Premier League with ENPPI SC on 2005 and was tapped by Muktijoddha Sangsad KC in the Bangladesh Premier League on 2012.This was the start of his international career as Lynx F.C. of Gibraltar National League took him in as their standout on 2015.

After his performance in Europe, leading football agency in Maldives, Transfer Academy, negotiated Magdy to Maldives for Club Eagles to help the team win the championship in 2016 President's Cup (Maldives) in the Dhivehi League. He bagged the "Best Player" of the game.

Magdy is currently playing in one of the newer established sporting clubs in Kuwait, Burgan SC
