= Mariano Dias =

Indian footballer and coach

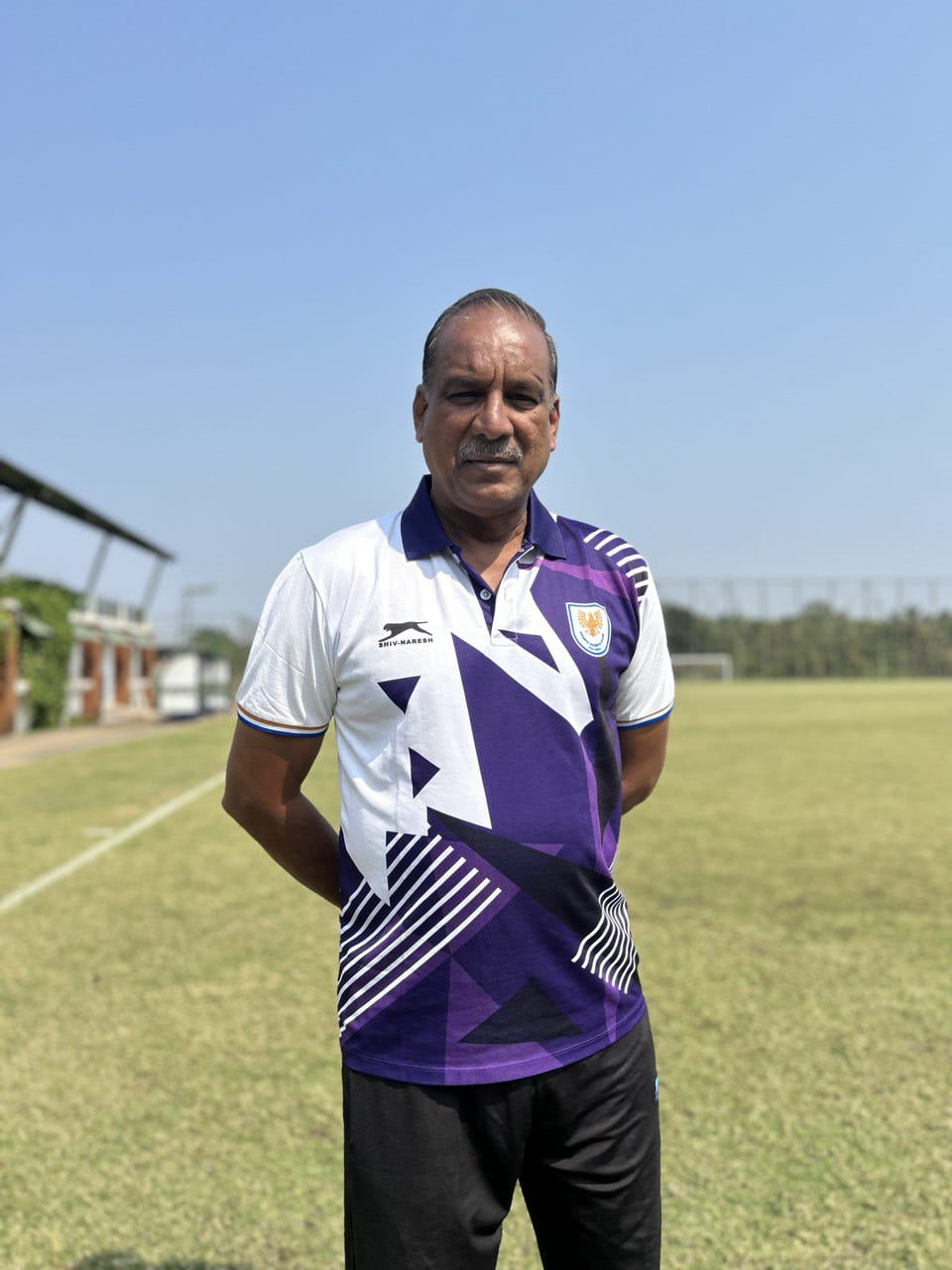

Personal information
- Date of birth: 10 February 1960 (age 66)
- Place of birth: Goa, India
- Position: Defender

Team information
- Current team: Dempo SC (Head of Youth Development)

Youth career
- 1974-1980: Goa

Senior career*
Years	Team	Apps	(Gls)
1980–1989	Salgaocar	315	(35)
1989–1993	MRF FC	105	(15)
1993–1994	Churchill Brothers	35	(5)

International career
1985–1990	India	28	(4)

Managerial career
- 2007-2008: India U14
- 2008–2010: SESA
- 2010-2011: Goa
- 2011–2012: India (assistant manager)
- 2012—2014: Churchill Brothers
- 2014-2015: FC Goa (Head of Youth development)
- 2015—2022: Salgaocar F.C. (assistant coach)
- * Club domestic league appearances and goals

Mariano Dias (born 10 February 1960) is an Indian football coach and former player who was previously the head coach for Churchill Brothers S.C. in the I-League.

== Playing career ==
Dias started his footballing career in 1981 for Salgaocar S.C. and stayed till 1989 when he moved to MRF FC. He stayed at MRF till 1993 and he signed with Churchill Brothers. He stayed at Churchill Brothers till he retired one year later in 1994.

== Coaching career ==
Dias started coaching the India U14 football team in 2007 during the 2007 AFC U14 Festival. He stayed with India U14 for one year. In 2008 Dias signed with SESA Football Academy. He coached SESA during the 2009 I-League 2nd Division in which SESA failed to gain promotion. Dias then signed with the Goa Football Association to coach the Goa football team during the 2009 Santosh Trophy tournament which Goa Won after a long time. Later for the 2010 Santosh Trophy. The team managed to reach the semi-finals where the club lost 3–4 on penalties to West Bengal. After coaching Goa, Dias signed with former club as a player, Salgaocar, to become the Senior Director of Football. On 25 November 2011 it was announced that Dias had been appointed as assistant manager of the India national football team.

=== Churchill Brothers ===
On 13 July 2012 it was announced that Dias had been signed by the Churchill Brothers to become their new head coach. He was instrumental in Churchill brothers winning the I league for 2013 as head Coach. In 2014 Mariano Dias single-handedly coached Churchill brothers to their first Federation Cup Win. Mariano was again in the limelight when he managed to assist Churchill Brothers Team to survive relegation from the I-League in the last 3 matches. He also revived the club in the Asian Football Confederation's (AFC) Cup, Asian football second-tier club competition.

== Managerial statistics ==
Statistics accurate as of 17 February 2013

Team	From	To	Record				
Team	From	To	G	W	D	L	Win %
Churchill Brothers	13 July 2012	present	59	29	15	15	49.15
Total			59	29	15	15	49.15

== Honours ==
=== Manager ===
Churchill Brothers

- I-League: 2012–13
- Federation Cup: 2013–14
