= FC Kochin =

Indian association football based in Kochi

Kochin
- Full name: Football Club Kochin
- Nickname: The Elephants
- Short name: FCK
- Founded: 1997; 29 years ago
- Dissolved: 2002; 24 years ago
- Ground: Jawaharlal Nehru International Stadium
- Capacity: 60,000
- League: Kerala Premier League 2
- Website: www.fckochin.in
Home colours	Away colours

FC Kochin (often spelt FC Cochin) was an Indian professional football club based in Kochi, Kerala. In the late 1990s, it was the only football club from Kerala to participate in National Football League, then top tier of Indian football league system.

Incorporated in 1997, the club was nicknamed "the elephants", and played at the Jawaharlal Nehru Stadium in Kaloor. They have also competed in Kerala Premier League under license from Kerala Football Association (KFA). After experiencing financial crisis, the club dissolvent its departments in 2002.

== History ==
=== Formation and journey ===
Football Club Kochin was founded in April 1997, with aims to develop the structure of association football in the state of Kerala. Paul Varghese is the chief Patron behind the making of the club and K.J. Varoo was the first Manager.

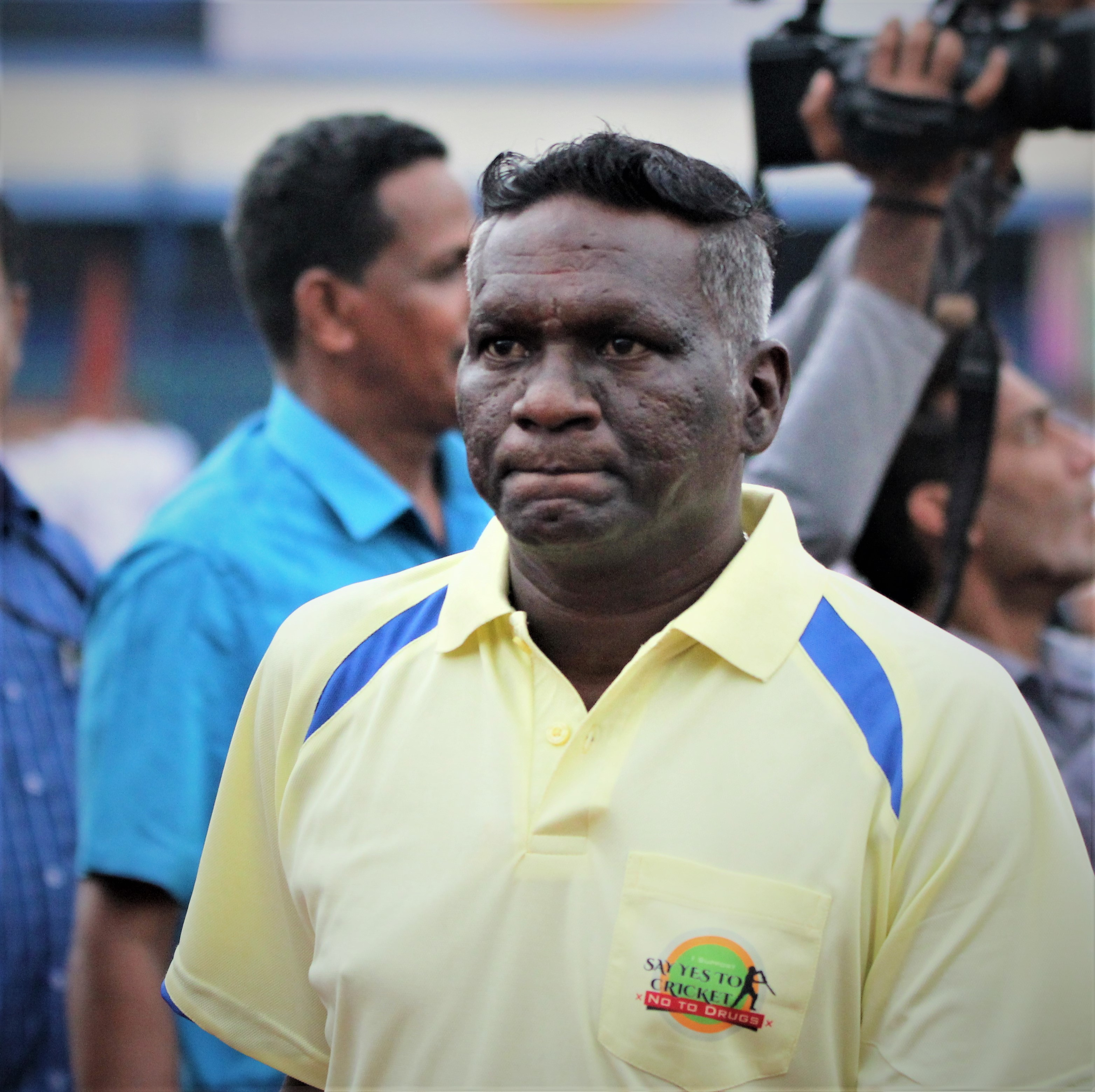
Former India captain I. M. Vijayan had two successful stints with FC Kochin during 1997–98 and 1999–01 seasons.

M. P. Kurian was the founder cum chairman of the FC Kochin Trust and M. K. Joseph was the founder cum chairman of the FC Kochin Limited Company. These organisations played a key role behind the development of the club during the late 1990s. After the fall of Kerala Police FC, FC Kochin filled the void of football in the state.

FC Kochin was known for promoting modern footballing infrastructure. It is considered as the first professional club in India, whose motto was "a new approach to the game". The development of FC Kochin lit a spark in Kerala, with the football-mad people embracing the club with open arms.

In the 1997–98 Indian National Football League, the FC Kochin finished on fourth position with 29 points in 18 league matches and club captain Raman Vijayan won the golden boot with 10 goals.

=== Durand victory ===
FC Kochin began their 1997 Durand Cup campaign by beating seven times Durand champion, Border Security Force by 2–1. In the next match, they thrashed Kolkata giant, Mohammedan Sporting by 5–0 with Vijayan scoring his first hat-trick for Kochin followed by goals from Raman Vijayan and B. Deepu. They went into the knock-out of their first Durand Cup as group-topper which attracted many Keralites settled in the capital to watch their match. In the semi-final, they locked horns with the then best team, JCT FC.

In the final, they emerged as champions in the prestigious tournament, defeating Mohun Bagan AC by 3–1, under captaincy of Jo Paul Ancheri. India star I. M. Vijayan also led the team later. Foreign players like Mykola Shevchenko of Ukraine, Josiah Seton of Liberia, Obinna Winners Onyia of Benin and Ali Abubakkar of Ghana were included in the squad for both the Durand Cup and NFL of 1997.

==== Scissors Cup ====
In 1997, FC Kochin participated in the Scissors Cup and reached to the final, that held in Kerala. The final, against Bahraini side West Riffa, turned out to be a damp squib with the game abandoned due to a power cut in the stadium. The Bahraini team were adjudged winners after a coin toss.

=== NFL seasons ===
In the coming years they were not able to replicate the form they showed in their first season, although they managed to come fourth in the national football league in 1998. The next three seasons saw them finishing sixth, fourth and fourth again in the National Football League. This was the time when FC Kochin was coached by T.K. Chathunni, one of the best football coaches in India.

=== KPL wins ===
FC Kochin crowned the inaugural season of Kerala Premier League in 1998, and later, they retained title, after winning the second edition in December 1999.

=== POMIS Cup 2001 ===
FC Kochin went to Maldives and took part in 15th edition of the POMIS Cup in 2001. After achieving second place in group stages, the club moved to semi-final, but lost 2–0 to Club Valencia.

=== Last season: 2001–02 ===
For the 2001–02 NFL season, FC Kochin roped in Czech manager Karel Stromšík as head coach. They signed four foreigners, Ukrainian Mykola Shevchenko, Nigerian international Obinna Winners Onyia, Liberian national team player Josiah Seton, and Ghanaian goalkeeper. In that season, the club earned 17 points in 22 league matches, finished in eleventh place and relegated to the NFL II along with Punjab Police. FC Kochin's Sunday Seah made a mark in that season.

== Home stadium ==
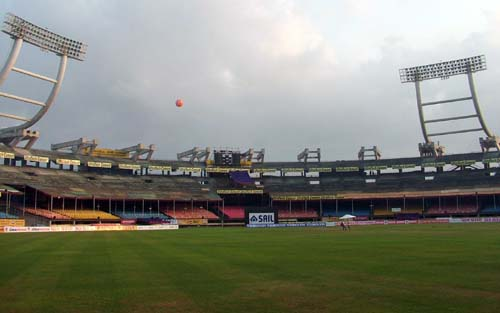
The Kaloor Stadium before renovation, home of FC Kochin until 2004.

FC Kochin used the Jawaharlal Nehru International Stadium, for their home matches in both of the National Football League (India) and Kerala Premier League. The stadium has a capacity of 60,000 spectators.

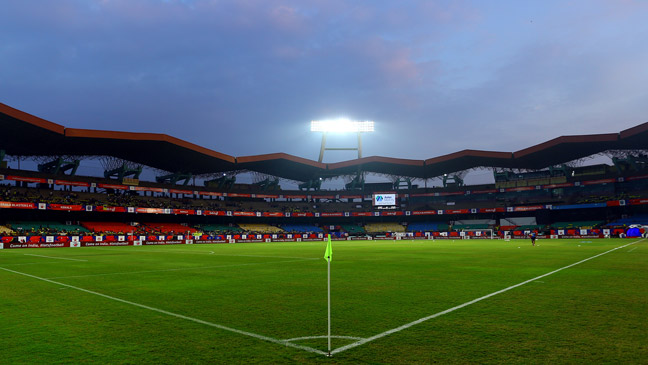
The stadium on a matchday

== Achievements ==
FC Kochin had contributed substantially to the advancement of Kerala football within its short span. The most prestigious achievement for FC Kochin was winning the Durand Cup in New Delhi in 1997, the first club Kerala to do so. In that year, they clinched Kerala State Football League title, defeating State Bank of Travancore.

FC Kochin had also put up a consistent performance in the National Football League, until their relegation in 2002.

== Rivalries ==
FC Kochin shared rivalries predominantly with Kerala-based clubs — Viva Kerala, Kerala Police Club, SBI Kerala, Titanium XI and Quartz Calicut, whom they faced in domestic and regional tournaments.

== Kit manufacturers and shirt sponsors ==
The official sponsors of FC Kochin (1998–2002)

Period	Kit Manufacturer	Shirt Sponsor	Back Sponsor	Other sponsors
1998–2002	Reebok	Kalyani Black Label	Kingfisher	Pepsi, Hi-Power, Coca-Cola

== Notable players ==
This list comprises notable Indian and foreign footballers, who played for FC Kochin (between 1997 and 2004) in the National Football League of India. Some of them have also represented their respective countries before or after joining the club.

- (India) Carlton Chapman (1997–1998)
- (India) Raman Vijayan (1997–1998)
- (India) I. M. Vijayan (1997–1998; 1999–2001)
- (India) Vinu Jose (1998–1999)
- (India) Prabhjot Singh (1998–1999)
- (India) Noel Wilson (1998–2000)
- (India) Naseem Akhtar (1998–2000)
- Santhosh Vasudevan (1997 - 2002)
- (Ghana) Ali Abubakar (1998–1999)
- (Ghana) Mohammad Salisu (1998–1999)
- (Bermuda) Keith Jennings (1998–2000)
- (Nigeria) Friday Elahor (1997–1998)
- (Liberia) Pewou Bestman (2001–2002)
- (Ukraine) Mykola Shevchenko (1997)
- (India) Mahesh Gawli (1998–1999)
- (Liberia) Eugene Gray (1999–2001)
- (India) Noel Wilson (1998–2000)
- (Zimbabwe) Tapera Madzima (1999–2000)
- (Benin) Obinna Winners Onyia (1997–1998)
- (India) Jo Paul Ancheri (1997–1998), (1999–2001)
- (Liberia) Sunday Seah (1999–2001)
- (India) C. V. Pappachan (1998–1999)
- (Liberia) Isaac Tondo (1999–2000)
- (Liberia) Williams Rashidi (2000–2001)
- (Liberia) Patrick Nuku Granue (2000–2002)
- (Liberia) Aaron Cole (2001)
- (Liberia) Josiah Seton (2001–2002)
- (Liberia) Philip Tarlue (2003–2004)

== Honours ==
=== League ===
- Kerala State Football League
  - Champions (2): 1998–99, 1999–00
  - Runners-up (1): 2003–04

=== Cup ===
- Durand Cup
  - Champions (1): 1997
- IFA Shield (Note: Fourth oldest club competition, organized by the IFA (W.B.) and played between local clubs of West Bengal and other invited ones.)
  - Runners-up (1): 1997
- Kerala State Championship
  - Champions (1): 1997
- All India Central Revenue Cup
  - Champions (1): 1999
- Central Railway Open
  - Champions (1): 1997
- Scissors Cup
  - Runners-up (1): 1997
- Mcdowell's Cup
  - Runners-up (1): 1997

== Withdrawal ==
With reduced sponsorship money after declining performance, and with Indian Football Federation failing to pay the dues to the club, it faced a financial crunch. Unpaid salaries and exodus of good players led to a low performance of the club in the top league. The club finished at 11th position in 2001–02 season and got relegated to Second Division. The club played Second Division twice, but failed to get promoted to Premier Division. The club could never resurrect itself after that, and went defunct in 2002 after it was revealed that the club had not paid salaries since 2000 after running up 2.5 crores in losses a season.

== Managerial history ==
- (India) A. M. Sreedharan (1997–1999)
- (India) K. Bharathan (1999)
- (India) T. K. Chathunni (1999–2000)
- (India) A. M. Sreedharan (2000–2001)
- (India) T. A. Jaffar (2001)
- (Czech Republic) Karel Stromšík (2001–2002)

== Team records ==
=== Overall records ===
- Highest goalscorer in the National Football League: (India) Raman Vijayan (with FC Kochin) in the 1997–98 season; 10 goals.

=== Notable wins against foreign teams ===
Competition	Round	Year	Opposition	Score	Venue	Ref
Bordoloi Trophy	Group stage	2001	(Thailand) Rajpracha	4–1	Nehru Stadium, Guwahati	

== See also ==
- Sports in Kerala
- History of Indian football
- List of football clubs in Kerala
- Defunct football clubs in India
