= Mykola Shevchenko =

Ukrainian footballer and coach

Personal information
- Full name: Mykola Mykolayevich Shevchenko
- Date of birth: 24 September 1967 (age 59)
- Place of birth: Kyiv, Ukrainian SSR
- Height: 1.86 m (6 ft 1 in)
- Position: Defender

Youth career
- Zvezda Kirovograd

Senior career*
Years	Team	Apps	(Gls)
1985–1986	Zirka Kirovohrad	15	(0)
1987–1988	Lokomotive Cottbus		
1989–1991	Zirka Kirovohrad	101	(5)
1991–1992	Unia Nowa Sarzyna	28	(9)
1992–1995	Polihraftekhnika Oleksandriya	86	(4)
1995	→ Nyva Vinnytsia (loan)	8	(0)
1996	Vorskla Poltava	3	(0)
1996	→ Polihraftekhnika Oleksandriya (loan)	4	(0)
1996–1997	Koba Senec		
1997	Slovan Duslo Šaľa		
1998	MHSK Tashkent	23	(1)
1999	Traktor Tashkent	15	(2)
1999	Churchill Brothers		(1)
2000	Traktor Tashkent	14	(0)
2000	Dempo		
2001	Malé		
2001–2004	Kochin		
2002	→ Surkhon Termez (loan)	13	(0)

Managerial career
- 2014: Metallurg Bekabad (assistant)
- 2017: Churchill Brothers
- 2018–2019: Navbahor Namangan (assistant)
- * Club domestic league appearances and goals

Mykola Mykolayevich Shevchenko (Ukrainian: Микола Миколайович Шевченко; born 24 September 1967) is a Ukrainian football manager and a former player.

== Playing career ==
Born in Ukraine, Shevchenko played for National Football League sides Churchill Brothers and Dempo SC during his playing days in India. He has also appeared with another NFL side FC Kochin before joining two Goan sides, during the 1997 season.

== Coaching career ==
=== Churchill Brothers: 2017 ===
On 13 November 2017, it was announced that Shevchenko would return to Churchill Brothers as their head coach. His first game as coach occurred on 2 December 2017 when Churchill Brothers took on Shillong Lajong, resulting in a 2–0 loss. After poor performance of the team he was sacked from the position.

== Statistics ==
=== Managerial statistics ===
As of 28 December 2017.

Team	From	To	Record				
Team	From	To	G	W	D	L	Win %
(India) Churchill Brothers	2 December 2017	Present	5	0	0	5	0.00
Total			5	0	0	5	0.00

== Honours ==
FC Kochin

- Durand Cup: 1997
