= Carlos Roberto Pereira =

Brazilian association football manager (born 1946)

Personal information
- Full name: Carlos Roberto Pereira da Silva
- Date of birth: 22 March 1946 (age 80)
- Place of birth: Brazil

Managerial career
- Years: Team
- 1970: Madureira (assistant manager)
- 1970–1974: Vasco da Gama (assistant manager)
- 1974–1976: Madureira (assistant manager)
- 1976–1980: Desportiva Ferroviária (assistant manager)
- 1981: Sadd (assistant manager)
- 1982–1986: Al Ain (assistant manager)
- 1987: Rubro
- 1988: AAP
- 1991–1994: Bayer
- 1994: Vasco da Gama (assistant manager)
- 1996–1997: Home United
- 1999–2000: Boavista
- 2002–2003: Al-Nasser
- 2003: Al-Arabi
- 2003–2004: Al-Merrekh
- 2006–2007: East Bengal
- 2007–2008: Mohun Bagan
- 2009: Churchill Brothers
- 2012: Churchill Brothers

Carlos Roberto Pereira da Silva (born 22 March 1946) is a Brazilian association football manager. He managed Bengal Mumbai FC in the Mumbai Football League from 2008 to 2009.
