= Churchill Brothers FC =

Indian association football club

Churchill Brothers
- Full name: Churchill Brothers Football Club Goa
- Nickname: The Red Machines
- Short name: CB; CBFC
- Founded: 1988; 38 years ago (as Varca Sports Club)
- Ground: Fatorda Stadium
- Capacity: 19,000
- Owner: Churchill Brothers Sports Club Private Limited
- Head coach: Dimitris Dimitriou
- League: Indian Super League
| Home colours | Away colours |

Churchill Brothers SC Goa, commonly known as Churchill Brothers, is an Indian professional football club based in Margao, Goa. The club competes in the Indian Super League (ISL), the top tier of the Indian football league system, from the 2026–27 season, having acquired the sporting licence previously held by Jamshedpur FC in August 2026. (Note: References,) For most of its history, the club played in the National Football League and its successor, the I-League. (Note: References,)

The club has won the I-League title twice, and finished among the top three on nine other occasions in the national league. It has also won eight Goa League titles, three Durand Cups and a Federation Cup. Churchill Brothers were ranked the fourth-best Indian club and 648th in the world in the International Federation of Football History & Statistics rankings for the decade 2001–2010. The club is commonly nicknamed "The Red Machines".

== History ==
=== 1988–2009: Foundation and early years ===
Churchill Brothers FC was founded in 1988 as Varca Sports Club based in Varca, South Goa. After one season it was renamed Brothers Sporting Club. The club was subsequently bought by politician Churchill Alemao and renamed Churchill Brothers Football Club; it finished as runners-up of the National Football League three times, in 1996–97, 1999–2000 and 2001–02.

Churchill Brothers represented India in the 1997–98 Asian Club Championship, but were eliminated in the first round by the Vietnamese side Dong Thap, losing 2–1 on aggregate. In 1998 the club signed Bassim Yonan, the first Iraqi footballer to play in India. The Scottish manager Danny McLennan coached the team in the 1999–2000 season.

Churchill Brothers won the Durand Cup in 2007 and the 2008–09 I-League, followed by the Durand Cup again in 2009 and the IFA Shield in the same year. In 2008 the Nigerian World Cup player Emeka Ezeugo was appointed head coach. The club had earlier been runners-up in the inaugural 2007–08 I-League.

The I-League title qualified Churchill Brothers for the 2010 AFC Champions League qualifiers, from which they dropped into the 2010 AFC Cup. They won both group matches against Al-Hilal Al-Sahili, finished second in the group and advanced to the knockout stage, where they lost 2–1 to Al-Qadsia at the Mohammed Al-Hamad Stadium.

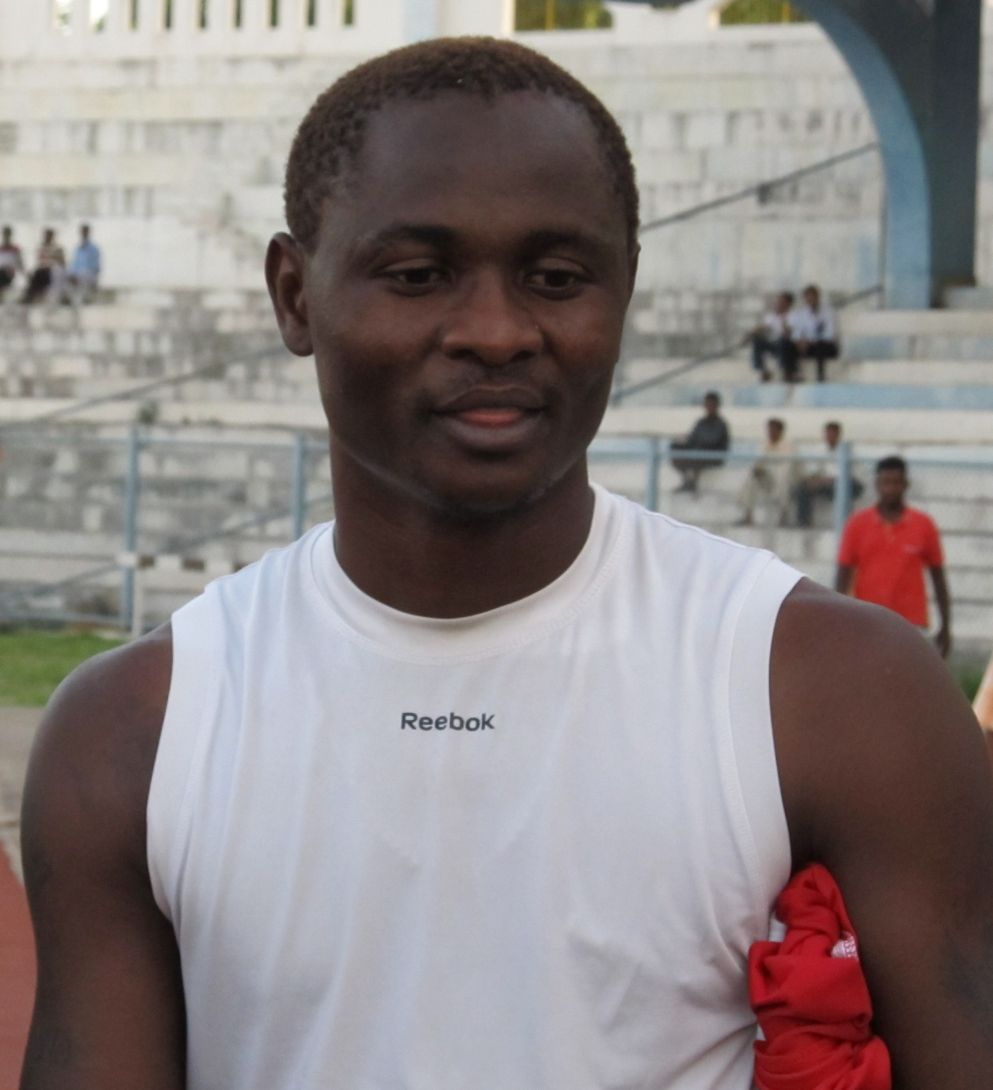
Odafe Onyeka Okolie, Churchill Brothers' all-time leading scorer with 128 league goals

=== 2010–2019: Second title and relegation battles ===
Vincent Subramaniam of Singapore managed the club for part of the 2010–11 I-League season. Croatian Drago Mamić took over for the remainder of the campaign and led the side to the IFA Shield.

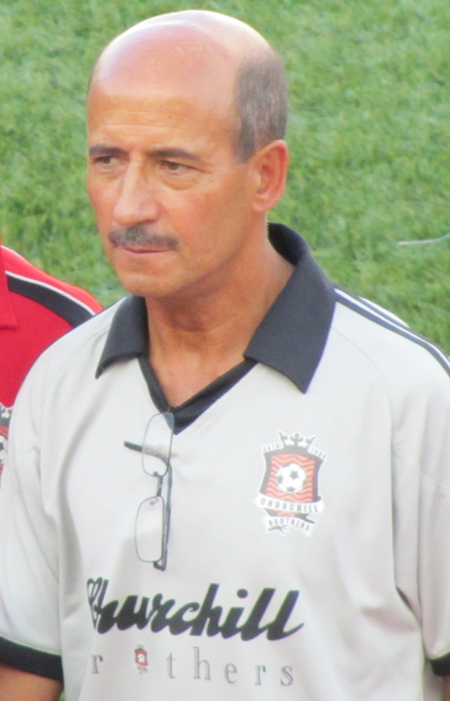
Manuel Gomes as coach of Churchill Brothers in 2011

On 9 June 2011, the club appointed the former Portugal national football team assistant Manuel Gomes as head coach. In October 2011 the team won the 2011 Durand Cup, a third title in the competition, beating Prayag United 5–4 on penalties. Gomes resigned on 15 February 2012 and the former coach Carlos Roberto Pereira returned on a caretaker basis.

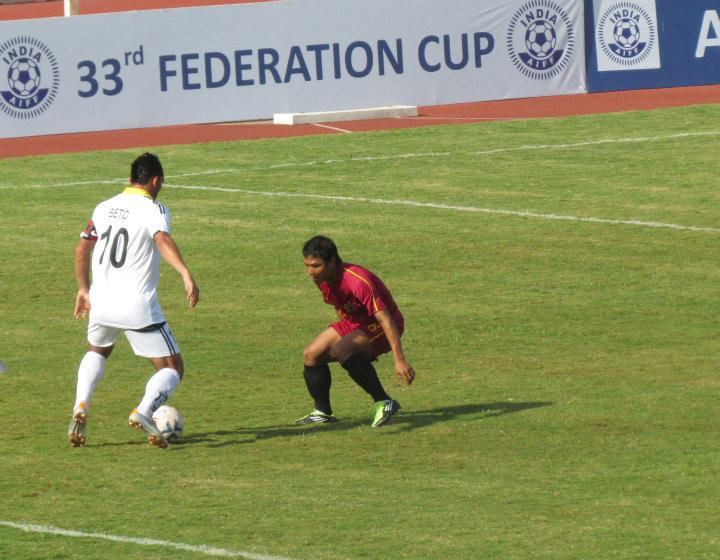
Churchill's Brazilian striker Beto (number 10) in action at the 2011 Federation Cup

Mariano Dias was appointed head coach on 13 July 2012 and in his first season guided the club to the 2012–13 I-League title, its second national championship.

Churchill Brothers won the 2013–14 Federation Cup, but after finishing 12th with 25 points from 24 matches in the 2013–14 I-League the club was excluded from the competition for failing to meet the Asian Football Confederation's club licensing criteria.

In November 2017 the Ukrainian Mykola Shevchenko was appointed head coach. His first match, on 2 December 2017 against Shillong Lajong, ended in defeat, and he was dismissed shortly afterwards. The club then brought in Joseph Afusi of Nigeria as technical director, but was relegated at the end of the 2017–18 season with 17 points from 18 matches. The club's place was later reinstated by the AIFF following a successful appeal.

The Romanian Petre Gigiu was appointed head coach in August 2018. The club finished fourth in the 2018–19 I-League with 34 points.

=== 2020–2025: I-League runners-up and title dispute ===
In September 2020 Churchill Brothers appointed the Spaniard Fernando Santiago Varela as head coach. Under Varela the club finished as runners-up of the 2020–21 I-League with 29 points; although Churchill won their final match against RoundGlass Punjab, Gokulam Kerala FC took the title on head-to-head record.

Ahead of the 2021–22 I-League the club signed its first Guinean player, Sekou Sylla, and Petre Gigiu returned as head coach. The team finished fourth. Later that year the club reached the final of the Baji Rout Cup in Odisha, losing to Rajasthan United. Churchill finished sixth in both the 2022–23 and 2023–24 seasons and also took part in the 2023 Indian Super Cup and the 2024 Bhausaheb Bandodkar Memorial Trophy. In October 2024 the Cypriot Dimitris Dimitriou was appointed head coach.

==== 2024–25 title dispute ====
Churchill Brothers provisionally finished top of the 2024–25 I-League table with 40 points. The title, however, remained unresolved because of a protest by second-placed Inter Kashi, who claimed three points from a fixture against Namdhari SC in which an ineligible player had allegedly been fielded. On 13 April 2025 Churchill Brothers withdrew from the Super Cup in protest at the delay.

On 19 April 2025 the AIFF Appeals Committee declared Churchill Brothers champions of the 2024–25 I-League, a ruling that also carried promotion to the Indian Super League. Inter Kashi appealed to the Court of Arbitration for Sport (CAS), which overturned the AIFF decision on 18 July 2025 and crowned Inter Kashi champions, leaving Churchill Brothers as runners-up.

=== 2025–26: Absence from national competition ===
Following the CAS ruling, Inter Kashi were promoted to the ISL in place of Churchill Brothers. The Goan club challenged the AIFF before the Delhi High Court and separately sought admission to the ISL as an additional team. On 12 February 2026, two days before the 2025–26 Indian Super League season began, the AIFF Executive Committee rejected Churchill Brothers' application, with only one of its 22 members voting in the club's favour.

At the same meeting the AIFF approved the rebranding of the I-League as the Indian Football League (IFL), together with a governance structure giving the participating clubs a 60 per cent stake in the competition. Churchill Brothers did not enter the 2025–26 IFL, which began on 27 February 2026 with ten teams, and consequently played in no national competition that season; the AIFF subsequently demoted the club to I-League 2 for non-participation.

=== 2026–present: Acquisition of the Jamshedpur licence and ISL entry ===
On 31 July, Jamshedpur FC announced that it would not take part in the 2026–27 Indian Super League, ending a nine-year association with the competition. The withdrawal followed the expiry of the AIFF's extended deadline for clubs to pay the first instalment of the participation fee. On 14 August, Tata Steel agreed to transfer its entire shareholding in Jamshedpur Football & Sporting Private Limited (JFSPL) to Churchill Brothers Sports Club Private Limited for a token consideration of ₹100. The transaction covered the club's ISL sporting licence and contracts of 12 players and 2 coaches, which Churchill Brothers agreed to take over from September. Completion was made subject to the AIFF approval by 31 August 2026. Tata Steel's vice-president for corporate services, D. B. Sundara Ramam, said that the company would refocus its football investment on grassroots and youth development through the Tata Football Academy. The sale agreement recorded JFSPL's turnover for the financial year as ₹32.23 crore (US$3.4 million), equivalent to 0.01 per cent of Tata Steel's consolidated turnover. Churchill Brothers paid the full ₹1.1 crore (US$120,000) participation fee to the AIFF, becoming one of 13 clubs to complete the payment. The takeover marked the club's first appearance in the top division of Indian football since the 2017–18 I-League.

== Crest ==
A new red-and-black crest was introduced in 2011. The original crest featured a football on green grass with yellow rays representing the sun, together with the club's initials.

Former club crest (1988–2011)

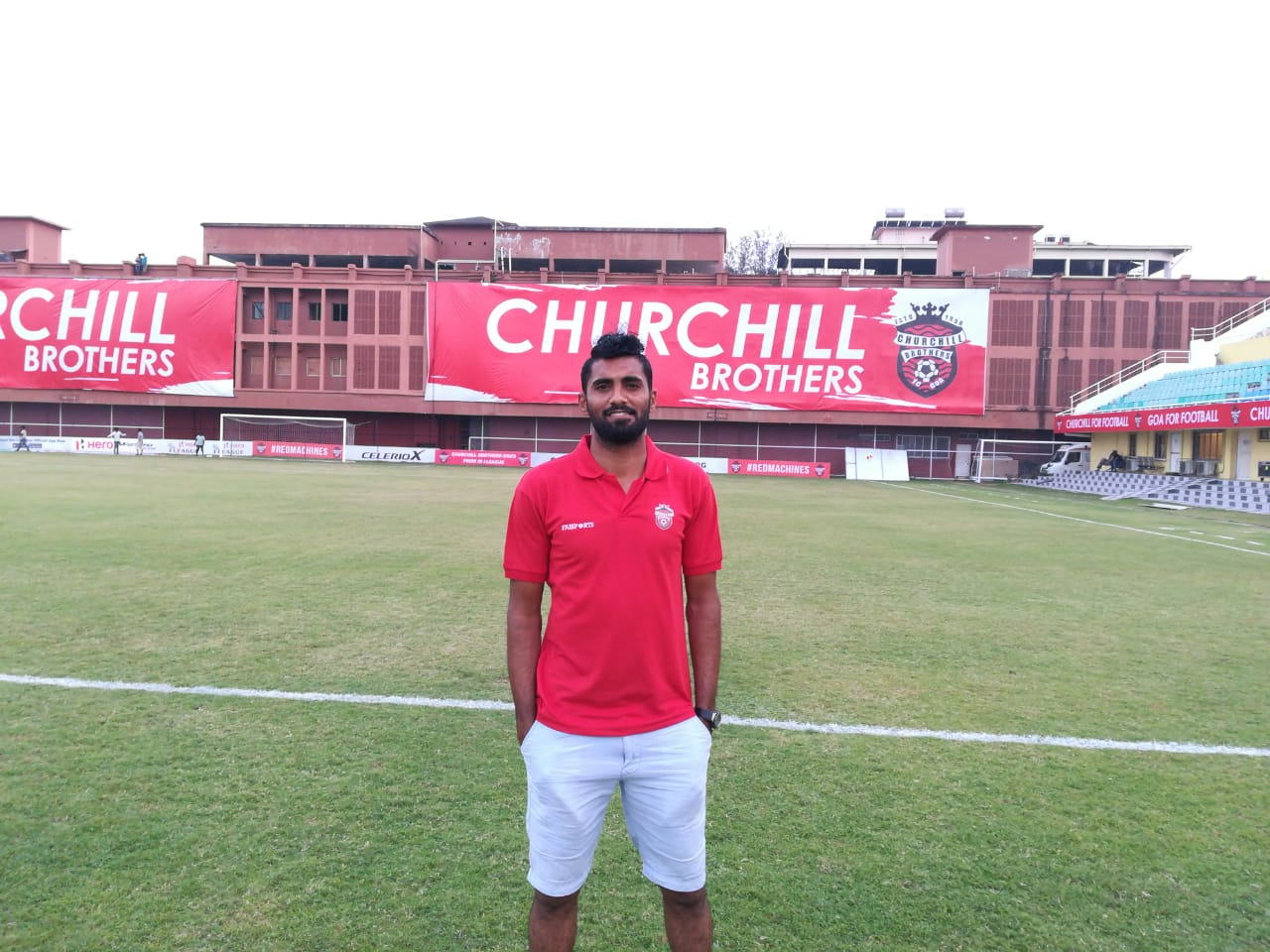
Churchill Brothers player Jayanth Kumar in the club's red home kit at their former home ground in Vasco

== Kit manufacturers and shirt sponsors ==
| Period | Kit manufacturer | Shirt sponsor |
|---|---|---|
| 1988–11 | | Churchill Brothers |
| 2011–17 | Nivia | Churchill Brothers |
| 2017–18 | Faisports | Churchill Brothers |
| 2018–23 | Nivia | Churchill Brothers |
| 2023–24 | Trak-Only | Churchill Brothers |
| 2024–26 | King Sports | Churchill Brothers |
| 2026–27 | Nivia | Churchill Brothers |

== Ownership and nickname ==
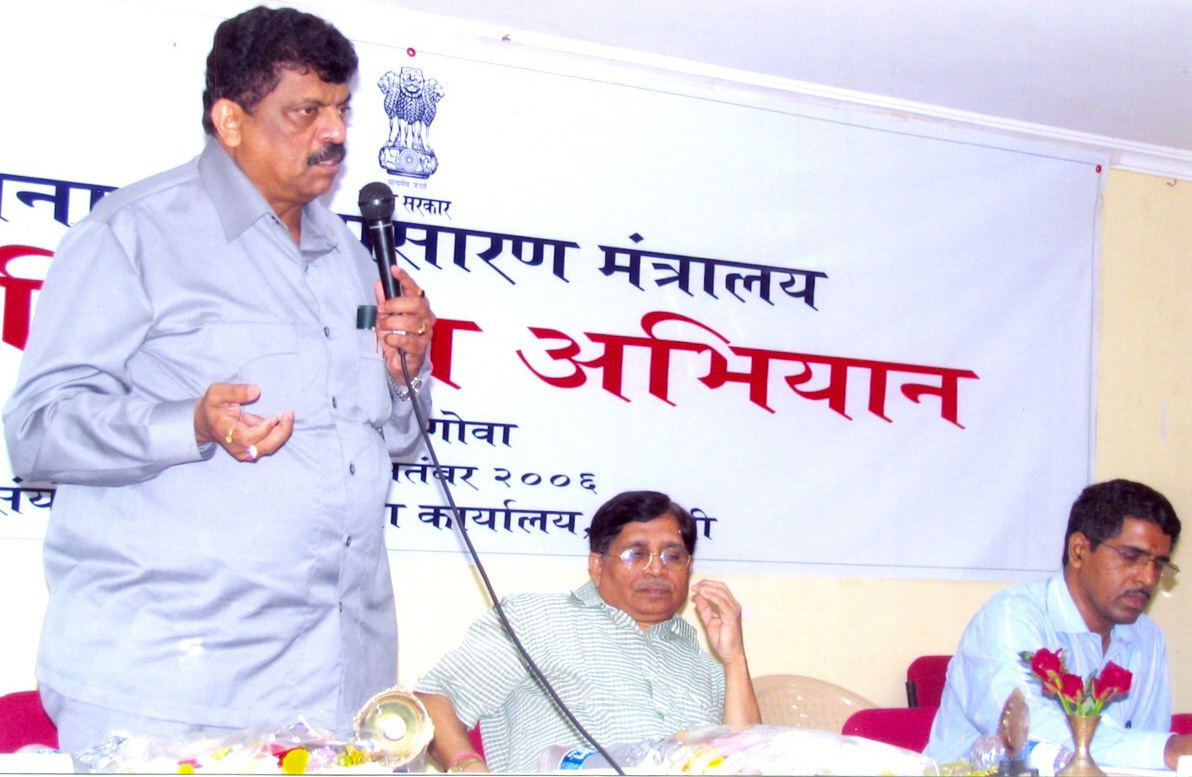
Churchill Alemao, founder and first owner of Churchill Brothers

Churchill Brothers has been owned and led for decades by the Goan entrepreneur and politician Churchill Alemao, a former president of the Goa Football Association and former Chief Minister of Goa. His daughter, Valanka Alemao, is the club's chief executive officer. The club operates through Churchill Brothers Sports Club Private Limited, which in August 2026 acquired Jamshedpur Football & Sporting Private Limited and with it the ISL sporting licence.

== Stadiums ==
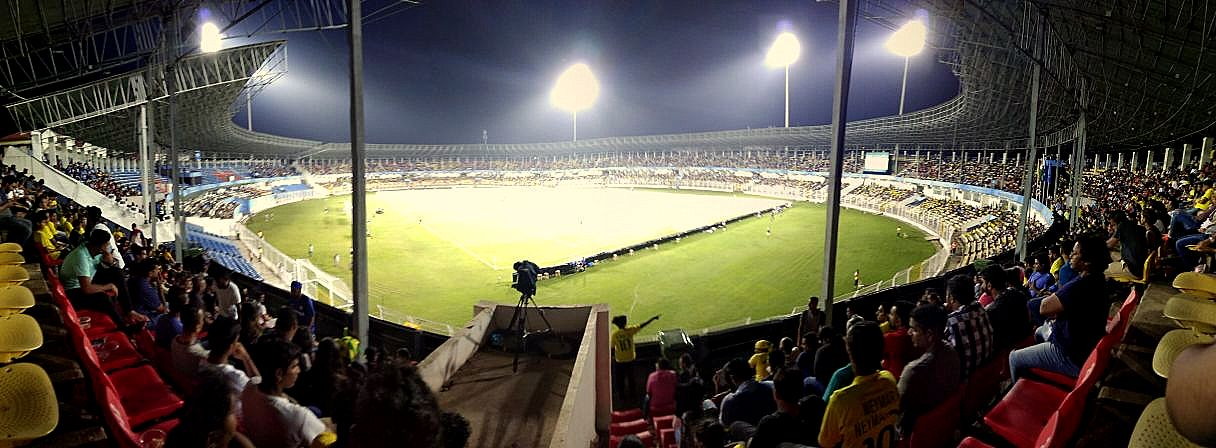
The Fatorda Stadium on a matchday

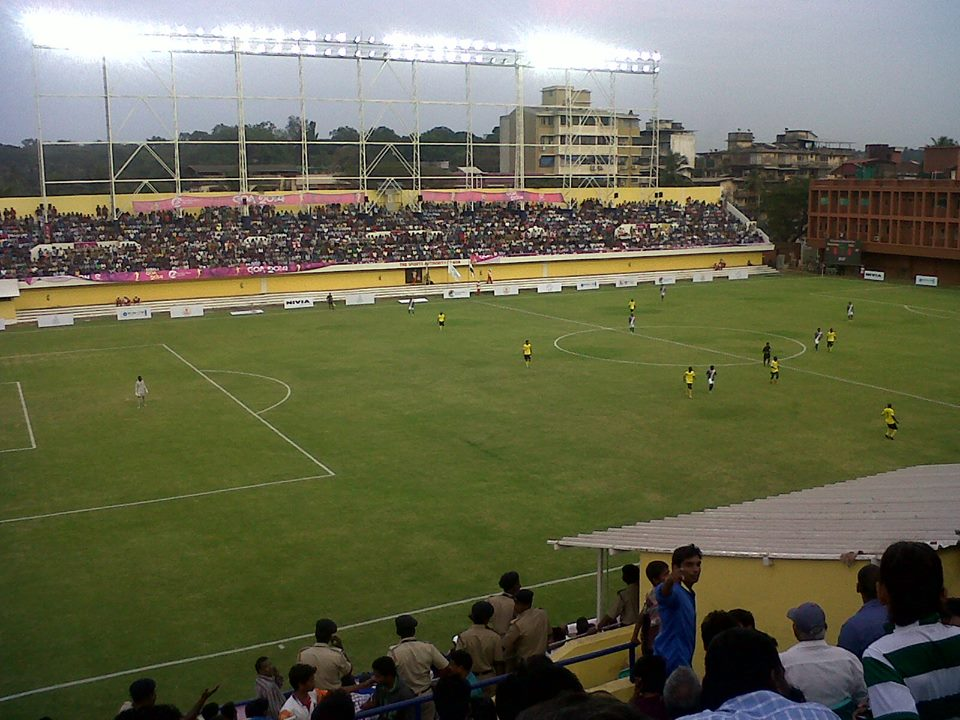
The Tilak Maidan Stadium on a matchday

Since the founding of the I-League, Churchill Brothers have mainly played at the Fatorda Stadium in Margao, a ground shared over the years with other Goan clubs including Dempo, Salgaocar, Sporting Clube de Goa and Vasco. The club has also used the Tilak Maidan Stadium in Vasco for both I-League and Goa Professional League fixtures.

During the 2012–13 I-League season the club temporarily played at the Duler Stadium in Mapusa while Fatorda was being renovated for the 2013 Lusophony Games and Tilak Maidan was being upgraded to AFC standards. For the 2013 AFC Cup the club used the Shri Shiv Chhatrapati Sports Complex in Pune as its home ground. In 2022 the club moved to the GMC Athletic Stadium in Bambolim, and in the 2024–25 I-League season it used the Raia Panchayat Ground in Raia.

== Rivalries ==
Churchill Brothers has a long-standing rivalry with the fellow Goan side Dempo, known as the "Goan Derby". The club also has rivalries with two other Goan sides, Sporting Clube de Goa and Salgaocar, whom it met in the I-League and continues to face in the Goa Professional League.

== Players ==
=== First-team squad ===
Note: Flags indicate national team as defined under FIFA eligibility rules; some limited exceptions apply. Players may hold more than one non-FIFA nationality.

| No. | Pos. | Nation | Player |
|---|---|---|---|
| 1 | GK | IND | Sayad Bin Abdul Kadir |
| 3 | MF | NGR | Joseph Okoro |
| 5 | MF | BFA | Dramane Salou |
| 6 | MF | IND | Angousana Wahengbam |
| 7 | MF | IND | Stendly Fernandes |
| 8 | MF | IND | Kingslee Fernandes |
| 9 | FW | RSA | Wayde Lekay |
| 10 | MF | COL | Sebastián Gutiérrez |
| 12 | DF | IND | Provat Lakra |
| 15 | DF | CIV | Alexandre Yeoule |
| 17 | DF | IND | Lalremruata |
| 18 | MF | IND | Gaurav Kankonkar |
| 19 | FW | NGR | John Okoli |
| 20 | DF | IND | Maibam Deny Singh |
| 21 | DF | IND | Melroy Assisi |

| No. | Pos. | Nation | Player |
|---|---|---|---|
| 23 | FW | IND | Trijoy Savio Dias |
| 24 | DF | IND | Parag Shrivas |
| 25 | GK | IND | Anuj Kumar |
| 26 | MF | IND | Phijam Sanathoi Meetei |
| 33 | MF | IND | Richard Costa |
| 44 | DF | IND | Gaurav Bora |
| 47 | FW | IND | Vincy Barretto |
| 49 | DF | IND | Lalbiakhlua |
| 57 | FW | IND | Anil Rama Gaonkar |
| 90 | FW | IND | Freddy Lalrinkima |
| 92 | MF | IND | Pasang Dorjee Tamang |
| — | GK | IND | Niraj Kumar |
| — | DF | IND | Felixson Fernandes |
| — | MF | IND | Dattaraj Gaonkar |
| — | FW | IND | Moses Lalrinzuala |

== Personnel ==
=== Management ===
| Position | Name |
|---|---|
| Owner | (India) Churchill Brothers Sports Club Private Limited (Churchill Alemao) |
| Chief executive officer | (India) Valanka Alemao |

== Honours ==
=== League ===
- I-League
  - Champions (2): 2008–09, 2012–13
  - Runners-up (4): 2007–08, 2009–10, 2020–21, 2024–25 (Note: Churchill Brothers were declared champions of the 2024–25 I-League by the AIFF Appeals Committee in April 2025; the decision was overturned by the Court of Arbitration for Sport in July 2025, which awarded the title to Inter Kashi.)
- National Football League
  - Runners-up (3): 1996–97, 1999–2000, 2001–02
  - Third place (2): 1997–98, 1999–2000
- National Football League II
  - Runners-up (1): 2005–06

=== Cup ===
- Durand Cup
  - Champions (3): 2007, 2009, 2011
  - Runners-up (2): 2001–02, 2008
- Federation Cup
  - Champions (1): 2013–14
- IFA Shield (Note: The fourth-oldest football tournament in the world, organised by the Indian Football Association of West Bengal.)
  - Champions (2): 2009, 2011
- Rovers Cup
  - Runners-up (3): 1997, 1999, 2000–01
- Goa Governor's Cup
  - Champions (3): 2000, 2002, 2003
  - Runners-up (2): 1999, 2001
- Goa Police Cup
  - Champions (1): 1999
  - Runners-up (1): 2018
- Baji Rout Cup
  - Runners-up (1): 2022

=== Regional ===
- Goa Football League
  - Champions (8): 1995–96, 1996–97, 1997–98, 1999, 2000, 2001, 2008–09, 2019–20 (shared) (Note: Sporting Clube de Goa and Churchill Brothers were declared joint winners of the 2019–20 Goa Professional League after the remaining 13 fixtures could not be played because of the COVID-19 pandemic.)
  - Third place (1): 2007

== Performance in AFC competitions ==
- Asian Club Championship: 1 appearance

1997–98: First round

- AFC Champions League: 2 appearances

2002–03: Qualifying round 3
2010: Qualifying play-off

- AFC Cup: 3 appearances

2010: Round of 16
2013: Group stage
2014: Round of 16

== Team records ==
=== Seasonal records ===
| Season | Division | Teams | Position | Attendance | Federation Cup/Super Cup | Durand Cup | AFC Champions League | AFC Cup |
|---|---|---|---|---|---|---|---|---|
| 2016–17 | I-League | 10 | 6th | 2,560 | Group stage | DNP | DNP | DNP |
| 2017–18 | I-League | 10 | 9th | 2,921 | Round of 16 | DNP | DNP | DNP |
| 2018–19 | I-League | 11 | 4th | 3,387 | – | DNP | DNP | DNP |
| 2019–20 | I-League | 11 | 8th | 3,062 | – | DNP | DNP | DNP |
| 2020–21 | I-League | 11 | 2nd | – | – | DNP | DNP | DNP |
| 2021–22 | I-League | 13 | 4th | – | DNP | DNP | DNP | DNP |
| 2022–23 | I-League | 12 | 6th | – | DNP | DNP | DNP | DNP |
| 2023–24 | I-League | 13 | 6th | – | Group stage | DNP | DNP | DNP |
| 2024–25 | I-League | 12 | 2nd | – | Withdrew | DNP | DNP | DNP |
| 2025–26 | Did not enter any national competition | | | | | | | |
| 2026–27 | ISL | 13 | TBD | – | TBD | TBD | DNP | DNP |

Key

- Teams = Number of teams in the division
- Position = Final position in the league
- Attendance = Average league attendance
- DNP = Did not participate

=== Transfer record ===
- Highest transfer fee received – (Uganda) Khalid Aucho: ₹4 crore (US$430,000) for a move to the Egyptian club Misr Lel Makkasa in 2019.

=== Goalscoring record ===
- Top scorer of the Indian NFL while at Churchill Brothers: (Ghana) Philip Mensah (1998–99); (Ghana) Yusif Yakubu (2001–02, 2002–03).

=== Other records ===
- I-League Golden Boot winners while at Churchill Brothers: (Nigeria) Odafe Onyeka Okolie (three times: 2007–08, 2008–09, 2009–10); (Trinidad and Tobago) Willis Plaza (once: 2018–19).

=== Team awards ===
- I-League Fair Play Award: 2016–17

=== Notable wins against foreign teams ===
As of matches played 23 April 2014

| Competition | Round | Year | Opposition | Score | Venue | City | Ref. |
|---|---|---|---|---|---|---|---|
| AFC Cup | Group stage | 2010 | (Yemen) Al-Hilal Al-Sahili | 2–1 | Ali Muhsin Stadium | Sanaa | |
| AFC Cup | Group stage | 2010 | (Yemen) Al-Hilal Al-Sahili | 1–0 | Fatorda Stadium | Margao | |
| AFC Cup | Group stage | 2013 | (Singapore) Warriors | 3–0 | Shri Shiv Chhatrapati Sports Complex | Pune | |
| AFC Cup | Group stage | 2014 | (Maldives) New Radiant | 3–0 | Fatorda Stadium | Margao | |
| AFC Cup | Group stage | 2014 | (Singapore) Home United | 3–1 | Fatorda Stadium | Margao | |
| AFC Cup | Group stage | 2014 | (Maldives) New Radiant | 2–1 | Galolhu National Stadium | Malé | |

== Managerial history ==
Note: the following list may be incomplete.

- (India) Armando Colaco (1994–1999)
- (Scotland) Danny McLennan (1999–2000)
- (Uzbekistan) Gregory Testvin (2000–2001)
- (India) T. K. Chathunni (2001–2002)
- (India) Marcus Pacheco (2002–2004)
- (India) Shabbir Ali (2004–2005)
- (Hungary) György Kottán (2005–2006)
- (Morocco) Karim Bencherifa (2006–2008)
- (Nigeria) Emeka Ezeugo (2008)
- (Serbia) Zoran Đorđević (2008–2009)
- (Brazil) Carlos Roberto Pereira (2009–2010)
- (Singapore) Vincent Subramaniam (2010–2011)
- (Croatia) Drago Mamić (2011)
- (India) Sukhwinder Singh (2011)
- (Portugal) Professor Neca (2011–2012)
- (Brazil) Carlos Roberto Pereira (2012)
- (India) Mariano Dias (2012–2014)
- (Nigeria) Joseph Afusi (2014)
- (India) Alfred Fernandes (2014–2016)
- (Nigeria) Joseph Afusi (2016–2017)
- (India) Derrick Pereira (2017)
- (Ukraine) Mykola Shevchenko (2017)
- (Romania) Petre Gigiu (2018–2019)
- (Ghana) Edward Ansah (2019)
- (Portugal) Bernardo Tavares (2019–2020)
- (India) Mateus Costa (2020)
- (Spain) Fernando Santiago Varela (2020–2021)
- (Romania) Petre Gigiu (2021–2022)
- (Spain) Antonio Rueda Fernández (2022)
- (Spain) Fernando Santiago Varela (2022–2023)
- (India) Mateus Costa (2023)
- (Argentina) Edgardo Malvestiti (2023–2024)
- (Spain) Francesc Bonet (2024)
- (Cyprus) Dimitris Dimitriou (2024–2026)
- (Cyprus) Dimitris Dimitriou (2026–)

== Notable players ==
World Cup players

- (Nigeria) Emeka Ezeugo (1997–1998)
- (Trinidad and Tobago) Anthony Wolfe (2014, 2017, 2018–2019)

Foreign internationals

- (Macau) José Maria da Cruz Martins (1998–1999)
- (Zimbabwe) Tapera Madzima (1998–1999)
- (Ghana) Edward Ansah (1999–2003)
- (Uzbekistan) Igor Shkvyrin (2000–2001)
- (Kenya) Nicholas Muyoti (2006–2007)
- (Andorra) Óscar Sonejee (2008)
- (New Zealand) Kayne Vincent (2010–2011)
- (Gabon) Henri Antchouet (2011–2013)
- (Afghanistan) Balal Arezou (2011–2013)
- (Lebanon) Akram Moghrabi (2012–2013)
- (Lebanon) Bilal El Najjarine (2012–2013)
- (Jordan) Ra'ed Al-Nawateer (2013)
- (Syria) Yasser Shaheen (2013–2014)
- (Costa Rica) Cristhian Lagos (2014)
- (Trinidad and Tobago) Glenton Wolfe (2014)
- (Nigeria) Emmanuel Ariwachukwu (2014–2015)
- (Singapore) Precious Emuejeraye (2017–2018)
- (Uganda) Khalid Aucho (2018–2019)
- (Lebanon) Hussein El Dor (2018–2019)
- (Trinidad and Tobago) Willis Plaza (2018–2020)
- (Trinidad and Tobago) Radanfah Abu Bakr (2019–2020)
- (Trinidad and Tobago) Robert Primus (2019–2020)
- (Honduras) Clayvin Zúñiga (2021)
- (Tajikistan) Komron Tursunov (2022)
- (Senegal) Abdoulaye Sané (2022–2025)
- (Senegal) Momo Cissé (2022–2024)
- (Afghanistan) Sharif Mukhammad (2022–2024)
- (Jersey) Kurtis Guthrie (2024–2025)

Other notable players

- I. M. Vijayan (2004–2005) – captained India from 2000 to 2004; recipient of the Padma Shri and Arjuna Award and a multiple AIFF Player of the Year.
- (Nigeria) Odafe Onyeka Okolie (2005–2011, 2014–2016) – the club's all-time leading scorer with 128 league goals, and I-League top scorer in 2007–08, 2008–09 and 2009–10.
- Sunil Chhetri (2013) – India's most-capped player and all-time leading goalscorer.
- (Ghana) Yusif Yakubu (2001–2005, 2017) – NFL Golden Boot winner with Churchill Brothers in 2001–02 and 2002–03, scoring 65 goals in 103 league matches between 2001 and 2005.
- Abdelhamid Shabana (2013–2014) – former Egypt U-20 and U-23 international.
- (Mexico) David Izazola (2018) – winner of the 2011 CONCACAF U-20 Championship and bronze medallist at the 2011 FIFA U-20 World Cup.
- (Syria) Ahmad Al Kaddour (2013) – played at the 2012 AFC U-19 Championship.
- (Ghana) Sadat Bukari (2018–2019) – played at the 2005 FIFA U-17 World Championship.
- (The Gambia) Dawda Ceesay (2019) – played at the 2009 FIFA U-17 World Cup.
- Shadi Skaf (2021–2022) – captained Lebanon U-20 at the 2013 Jeux de la Francophonie.
- (Uruguay) Martín Cháves (2023–2024) – played at the 2015 South American U-17 Championship.

== Other departments ==
=== Women's team ===
The club runs a women's section which competes in the Goa Women's League and won the title in the 2022–23 season. The team has also taken part in the Indian Women's League. Midfielder Cia Ryzella Almeida was named Women's Player of the Year by the Goa Football Association in June 2023.

Honours

- Goa Women's League
  - Champions (1): 2022–23

=== Youth teams ===
The club's under-17 side competes in the AIFF Elite Youth League. The under-19 team reached the championship round of the 2011 I-League U-19, while the under-15 side has taken part in the Nike Premier Cup and the under-20 team in the I-League U20.

== See also ==
- List of Churchill Brothers S.C. seasons
- List of Goan state football champions
- Indian football clubs in Asian competitions
