= Petre Gigiu =

Romanian footballer and manager

Personal information
- Date of birth: 18 September 1953 (age 73)
- Place of birth: Bucharest, Romania

Managerial career
- Years: Team
- 1991–1993: Electromagnetica București
- 1993–1998: FC Südring Aschaffenburg
- 1998–1999: Foresta Suceava
- 1999–2000: Corvinul Hunedoara
- 2000: Universitatea Cluj
- 2000–2001: FCM Râmnicu Vâlcea
- 2001–2002: Al-Hilal II
- 2002–2003: Cimentul Fieni
- 2003–2005: US Chaouia
- 2005: CA Bordj Bou Arréridj
- 2006: Astra Ploiești
- 2008–2009: Poiana Câmpina
- 2009–2010: Minerul Lupeni
- 2010–2011: Ohod Club
- 2011–2012: US Chaouia
- 2013–2014: Seeb Club
- 2014: Sur SC
- 2014–2015: Dhofar Club
- 2015: CRB Aïn Fakroun
- 2015: US Chaouia
- 2016–2017: US Chaouia
- 2018–2019: Churchill Brothers
- 2020: Viitorul Dăești
- 2021–2022: Churchill Brothers

Petre Gigiu (born 18 September 1953) is a Romanian former football player and current manager.

== Coaching career ==
Gigiu managed a number of clubs in his native Romania and abroad in Germany, Algeria, Saudi Arabia and Oman.

=== Churchill Brothers ===
==== 2018–2019 ====
In August 2018, Gigiu was appointed head coach of Churchill Brothers of the I-League in India. His first competitive game as head coach was on 28 October 2018 in their opening match against the reigning champions, Minerva Punjab. The matched ended in a 0–0 draw.

==== 2021 ====
In July 2021, Gigiu returned to Churchill Brothers as head coach for their upcoming 2021–22 season.

== Statistics ==
=== Managerial statistics ===
As of 30 November 2018.

Team	From	To	Record				
Team	From	To	G	W	D	L	Win %
(India) Churchill Brothers	August 2018	Present	14	8	4	2	57.14
Total			14	8	4	2	57.14
