= Keith Jennings (footballer) =

Bermudian footballer

Personal information
- Full name: Keith Jennings
- Date of birth: August 22, 1977 (age 49)
- Place of birth: Bermuda
- Height: 5 ft 11 in (1.80 m)
- Position: Midfielder

Team information
- Current team: Southampton Rangers (manager)

Senior career*
Years	Team	Apps	(Gls)
1998–1999	Vasco Mariners		
1999–2001	FC Kochin		
2003–2009	North Village Rams		
2008–2009	Bermuda Hogges	9	(0)
2009–2010	Southampton Rangers		
2017–2018	North Village Rams	3	(5)

International career^{‡}
2006–2007	Bermuda	6	(1)

Managerial career
- 2010–2012: Southampton Rangers
- 2012–2015: St George's (assistant)
- 2015–: Southampton Rangers
- * Club domestic league appearances and goals as of 11 October 2009 ‡ National team caps and goals as of 23 January 2016

Keith Jennings (born August 22, 1977) is a Bermudian retired professional football player, who represented the Bermuda national football team on 6 occasions from 2006 to 2007.

== Club career ==
=== Bermuda ===
Jennings began his professional club career with Bermudian club Vasco Mariners in 1998 and played until 1999. With Vasco, he won the Bermudian Premier Division in 1998 and Bermuda FA Cup in 1999.

=== India ===
He later moved to India and signed with FC Kochin. He became the first ever Bermudian footballer to play for an Indian club. He represented the team in the top tier National Football League between 1999 and 2001. With Kochin, he achieved fame in India and won various regional tournaments including Kerala State Football League and All India Central Revenue Cup but finished fourth, twice in the National Football League.

=== Back to Bermuda ===
After his arrival in Bermuda, he has appeared with North Village Community Club in the Bermudian Premier Division before joining the Bermuda Hogges in the USL Second Division in 2008. With North Village Community Club, he lifted the Bermudian Premier Division twice in 2002–03 and 2005–06 seasons alongside the Bermuda FA Cup four times in 2002–03, 2003–04, 2004–05 and 2005–06 seasons. With Bermuda Hogges, he appeared in 5 Caribbean Club Championship qualification matches.

His playing career ended after he ruptured his spleen and had to have a kidney removed after a collision while playing for Southampton Rangers in 2010.

=== After breaking retirement ===
At the age of 41, he has also represented North Village Community Club in 2018 and scored against Somerset Trojans in a 2–1 win match in the Premier Division clash at Bernard Park. He played only 3 games in the Bermudan Corona League 2017/18 season, scoring a total of 5 goals.

== International career ==
He made his senior international debut for Bermuda in a CONCACAF Gold Cup qualification match against US Virgin Islands in September 2006, which ended up as Bermuda's 6–0 win.

Jennings earned a total of 6 caps, scoring 1 goal for his country. His final international match was a March 2007 friendly match against Canada, which ended up as a 3–0 loss for Bermuda.

== Career statistics ==
=== International goals ===
Scores and results list Bermuda's goal tally first.

N.	Date	Venue	Opponent	Score	Result	Competition	Reference
1.	27 September 2006	Lionel Roberts Stadium, Charlotte Amalie, U.S. Virgin Islands	U.S. Virgin Islands	6–0	6–0	2007 Caribbean Cup	

== Managerial career ==
Jennings was appointed as head coach of Southampton Rangers in June 2010 on a two-year deal. He was suspended for three years in March 2012 for assaulting referee Stephen Allen during a match of Bermudian Premier Division at Southampton Oval on 26 February. He returned to Rangers from the coaching staff at St George's in August 2015.

== Honours ==
Clube Vasco da Gama Bermuda

- Bermudian Premier Division: 1998
- Bermuda FA Cup: 1999

Kochin

- Kerala State Football League: 1999
- All India Central Revenue Cup: 1999

North Village Rams

- Bermudian Premier Division: 2002–03, 2005–06
- Bermuda FA Cup: 2002–03, 2003–04, 2004–05, 2005–06

== See also ==
- Bermuda men's international footballers
