= Maldives Cup Winners' Cup =

- Founded: 1995; 31 years ago
- Abolished: 2009
- Region: Maldives
- Last champions: New Radiant SC (4th title)
- Most championships: Club Valencia (6 titles)

Maldives Cup Winners' Cup is a football tournament played between champions of the 4 major tournaments of the previous year (Dhivehi Premier League, Maldives FA Cup, President's Cup, and POMIS Cup). It was brought back for the 2026/27 season by the Football Association of Maldives.

== Previous winners ==
- 1995: Club Lagoons
- 1999: New Radiant SC
- 2000: New Radiant SC
- 2001: Club Valencia
- 2002: Victory Sports Club
- 2003: New Radiant SC
- 2004: Club Valencia
- 2005: VB
- 2006: Victory Sports Club
- 2007: Club Valencia
- 2008: New Radiant SC
- 2026: Maziya S&RC
