= 2017 in Maldivian football =

Football in Maldives
- Season: 2017

Men's football
- Malé League: Maziya
- Minivan Championship: Dh. Kudahuvadhoo
- Second Division: Zefrol
- Charity Shield: Maziya

Overview of the 2017 season of association football in the Maldives.

== National teams ==
=== Maldives national football team ===
==== 2019 AFC Asian Cup Qualification Third Round ====
===== Group D =====
Pos	Team	Pld	W	D	L	GF	GA	GD	Pts	Qualification	Oman	Palestine	Maldives	Bhutan
1	Oman	6	5	0	1	28	5	+23	15 (Note: Head-to-head results: Palestine 2–1 Oman, Oman 1–0 Palestine (Oman are ahead of Palestine on away goals).)	2019 AFC Asian Cup	—	1–0	5–0	14–0
2	Palestine	6	5	0	1	25	3	+22	15	2019 AFC Asian Cup	2–1	—	8–1	10–0
3	Maldives	6	2	0	4	11	19	−8	6		1–3	0–3	—	7–0
4	Bhutan	6	0	0	6	2	39	−37	0		2–4	0–2	0–2	—

Source: AFC
Notes:

28 March 2017	Maldives	0–3	Palestine	National Football Stadium, Malé
21:00 UTC+5		Report	Maher 62', 65'; Abu Nahyeh 90+2'	Attendance: 6,000; Referee: Aziz Asimov (Uzbekistan)

13 June 2017	Bhutan	0–2	Maldives	Changlimithang Stadium, Thimphu
18:00 UTC+6		Report	Fasir 42' (pen.); Ah. Abdulla 75'	Attendance: 7,600; Referee: Khurram Shahzad (Pakistan)

5 September 2017	Oman	5–0	Maldives	Sultan Qaboos Sports Complex, Muscat
19:15 UTC+4	Al-Khaldi 5'; Al-Hajri 58'; Al-Yahyaei 69'; Al-Yahmadi 86'; Al-Hasani 88'	Report		Attendance: 1,136; Referee: Võ Minh Trí (Vietnam)

10 October 2017	Maldives	v	Oman	National Football Stadium, Malé
21:00 UTC+5		Report

14 November 2017	Palestine	v	Maldives	Faisal Al-Husseini International Stadium, Al-Ram
		Report

==== Friendlies ====
6 June 2017	Afghanistan	2-1	Maldives	Dubai, UAE
	Mukhammad 5'; Azadzoy 58'		Fasir 47' (pen.)	Stadium: Al-Rashid Stadium; Attendance: 200

=== Maldives national under-19 football team ===
==== 2018 AFC U-19 Championship Qualification ====
===== Group B =====
- All matches are held in Kyrgyzstan.
- Times listed are UTC+6.

Pos	Team	Pld	W	D	L	GF	GA	GD	Pts	Qualification
1	Tajikistan (H)	4	3	1	0	12	0	+12	10	Final tournament
2	Uzbekistan	4	3	0	1	17	1	+16	9	
3	Bangladesh	4	2	1	1	5	1	+4	7	
4	Maldives	4	0	1	3	2	14	−12	1	
5	Sri Lanka	4	0	1	3	2	22	−20	1	

Source: AFC
Rules for classification: Qualification tiebreakers
(H) Hosts

31 October 2017	Maldives	v	Sri Lanka
		Report

2 November 2017	Maldives	v	Bangladesh
		Report

4 November 2017	Uzbekistan	v	Maldives
		Report

6 November 2017	Tajikistan	v	Maldives
		Report

==== 2017 SAFF U-18 Championship ====
Pos	Team	Pld	W	D	L	GF	GA	GD	Pts	Status
1	Nepal (C)	4	3	0	1	6	2	+4	9 (Note: Nepal ahead of Bangladesh on head-to-head points: Bangladesh 1–2 Nepal)	Champion
2	Bangladesh	4	3	0	1	9	5	+4	9	
3	India	4	2	0	2	8	7	+1	6	
4	Bhutan (H)	4	2	0	2	2	5	−3	6	
5	Maldives	4	0	0	4	1	7	−6	0	

Source: Futbol24
Rules for classification: 1) points; 2) head-to-head points; 3) head-to-head goal difference; 4) goal difference; 5) number of goals scored;
(C) Champions; (H) Hosts
Notes:
18 September 2017
19:00 UTC+06:00

Maldives	0-1	Bhutan
	Report	52' Orgyen Tshering

Changlimithang Stadium, Thimphu
Referee: Abdur Rahman Dhali (Bangladesh)

20 September 2017
19:00 UTC+06:00

Maldives	0–2	Bangladesh
		9' Saikot Mahmoud Munna; 45' Jafar Iqbal

Changlimithang Stadium, Thimphu
Referee: Ugyen Dorji (Bhutan)

22 September 2017
16:00 UTC+06:00

Nepal	v	Maldives

Changlimithang Stadium, Thimphu

25 September 2017
16:00 UTC+06:00

India	v	Maldives

Changlimithang Stadium, Thimphu

=== Maldives national under-17 football team ===
==== 2018 AFC U-16 Championship Qualification ====
===== Group B =====
- All matches are held in Tajikistan.
- Times listed are UTC+5.

Pos	Team	Pld	W	D	L	GF	GA	GD	Pts	Qualification
1	Tajikistan (H)	3	3	0	0	17	0	+17	9	Final tournament
2	Oman	3	2	0	1	14	1	+13	6	Final tournament
3	Syria	3	1	0	2	6	8	−2	3	
4	Maldives	3	0	0	3	0	28	−28	0	
5	Turkmenistan	0	0	0	0	0	0	0	0	Withdrew

Source: AFC
Rules for classification: Qualification tiebreakers
(H) Hosts

20 September 2017	Oman	8–0	Maldives	Hisor Central Stadium, Hisor
16:00	I.K. Al-Naabi 8'; Al-Sinaidi 25', 61'; Al-Rasbi 43'; Al-Salti 45'; N.A. Al-Naabi 64', 72'; Al-Mashary 88'	Report		Attendance: 100; Referee: Mooud Bonyadifar (Iran)

22 September 2017	Maldives	v	Tajikistan	Hisor Central Stadium, Hisor
19:00		Report

24 September 2017	Syria	v	Maldives	Hisor Central Stadium, Hisor
16:00		Report

==== 2017 SAFF U-15 Championship ====
===== Group stage =====
====== Group B ======
Pos	Team	Pld	W	D	L	GF	GA	GD	Pts	Status
1	India	2	2	0	0	11	1	+10	6	Qualified for Knockout stage
2	Nepal (H)	2	1	0	1	7	2	+5	3	Qualified for Knockout stage
3	Maldives	2	0	0	2	0	15	−15	0	

Source: GoalNepal
(H) Hosts
19 August 2017
15:00

India	9–0	Maldives
Ravi Bahadur Rana 20', 26'; Ibrahim Anoof 22', 89' (o.g.); Moirangthem Thoiba Singh 41'; Vikram Pratap Singh 48', 70'; Ricky John Shabong 57'; Lalrokima 80'	Report

ANFA Complex, Satdobato
Referee: Golam Mourshed Choudhary (Bangladesh)

21 August 2017
15:00

Nepal	6–0	Maldives
Brijesh Chaudhary 14', 73'; Darshan Gurung 22'; Roshan Rana Magar 38' (pen.); Akash Budha 45+1', 47'	Report

ANFA Complex, Satdobato
Referee: D.D.Indika Sendanayake (Sri Lanka)

=== Maldives women's national football team ===
==== 2016 SAFF Women's Championship ====
Group stage was played in 2016. Maldives advanced to the tournament semi-finals as Group A runners-up.

===== Semi-final =====
2 January 2017

Bangladesh	6–0	Maldives
Shopna 11', 22', 58'; Khatun 48', 64' (pen.); Khatun 52'	Report

Kanchenjunga Stadium, Siliguri

== AFC competitions ==
=== 2017 AFC Cup ===
==== Play-offs ====
===== Preliminary round =====
Team 1	Agg.	Team 2	1st leg	2nd leg
South Asia Zone
Colombo (Sri Lanka)	2–4	(India) Mohun Bagan	1–2	1–2
Thimphu City (Bhutan)	0–3	(Maldives) Club Valencia	0–0	0–3

===== Play-off round =====
Team 1	Agg.	Team 2	1st leg	2nd leg
South Asia Zone
Club Valencia (Maldives)	2–5	(India) Mohun Bagan	1–1	1–4

===== Group stage =====
====== Group E ======
Pos	Team	Pld	W	D	L	GF	GA	GD	Pts	Qualification	BFC	MAZ	MOH	ABD
1	(India) Bengaluru FC	6	4	0	2	7	6	+1	12 (Note: Head-to-head results: Maziya 0–1 Bengaluru FC, Bengaluru FC 1–0 Maziya.)	Inter-zone play-off semi-finals	—	1–0	2–1	2–0
2	(Maldives) Maziya	6	4	0	2	10	4	+6	12		0–1	—	5–2	2–0
3	(India) Mohun Bagan	6	2	1	3	10	11	−1	7		3–1	0–1	—	3–1
4	(Bangladesh) Abahani Limited Dhaka	6	1	1	4	4	10	−6	4		2–0	0–2	1–1	—

Source: AFC

== League season ==
=== Premier League ===
Pos	Team	Pld	W	D	L	GF	GA	GD	Pts	Qualification
1	New Radiant (C)	14	13	0	1	44	9	+35	39	2018 AFC Cup group stage and 2017 President's Cup
2	TC Sports	14	10	2	2	31	14	+17	32	2017 President's Cup
3	Maziya	14	8	3	3	30	10	+20	27	2017 President's Cup
4	G. Dh. Thinadhoo	14	5	3	6	23	18	+5	18	2017 President's Cup
5	Green Streets	14	5	1	8	15	28	−13	16	
6	Sh. Milandhoo	14	3	5	6	18	26	−8	14	
7	A. A. Maalhos	14	2	3	9	18	40	−22	9	
8	Dh. Kudahuvadhoo	14	0	3	11	6	40	−34	3	

(C) Champions

=== Malé League ===
Pos	Team	Pld	W	D	L	GF	GA	GD	Pts	Qualification or relegation
1	Maziya (C)	14	8	3	3	18	8	+10	27	2017 Dhivehi Premier League
2	Green Streets	14	8	3	3	20	11	+9	27	2017 Dhivehi Premier League
3	New Radiant	14	8	3	3	22	15	+7	27	2017 Dhivehi Premier League
4	TC Sports Club	14	6	4	4	30	19	+11	22	2017 Dhivehi Premier League
5	Eagles	14	6	4	4	14	7	+7	22	Malé League qualification
6	Victory	14	6	4	4	19	18	+1	22	Malé League qualification
7	Valencia	14	1	3	10	7	26	−19	6	Malé League qualification
8	United Victory	14	1	0	13	4	30	−26	3	Malé League qualification

(C) Champions

=== Minivan Championship ===
==== Final ====
21 July 2017
21:00

G. Dh. Thinadhoo	0–2	Dh. Kudahuvadhoo
	Report	19' Irufan Adam Naseer; 79' Afonja Jibola

National Football Stadium, Malé

=== Second Division Football Tournament ===
==== Final ====
14 May 2017
21:00

Kudahenveiru	1 – 4	Zefrol
Yamin 88'	Report	45+2' Rifau; 51' Abu; 57' Shathir; 90' Kadar

National Football Stadium, Malé

== Cup competitions ==
=== FA Cup ===
==== Final ====
6 December 2017
21:00

TC Sports	2–2 (a.e.t.)	New Radiant
Stewart 6', 26' (pen.)	Report	50' Fazeel; 75' (pen.) Fasir
Penalties
El-Maghrabi (penalty scored); Stewart (penalty missed); Halil (penalty scored); Suhail (penalty missed)	2–4	(penalty scored) Fazeel; (penalty scored) Fasir; (penalty missed) El-Dor; (penalty scored) Akram; (penalty scored) Mohamed

National Football Stadium, Malé
Attendance: 1,800
Referee: Xaypaseuth Phongsanit (Laos)

=== President's Cup ===
==== Final ====
15 December 2017
21:00

New Radiant	–	TC Sports/Maziya

National Football Stadium, Male'

=== Charity Shield ===
16 February 2017
16:00

Maziya	1 – 0	Valencia
Asadhulla 70'	Report

National Football Stadium, Malé
