= Ali Haisam =

Maldivian footballer

Personal information
- Full name: Ali Haisam
- Date of birth: 4 April 1992 (age 34)
- Place of birth: Hithaadhoo, Maldives
- Position: Forward

Team information
- Current team: United Victory
- Number: 7

Youth career
- 2011: New Radiant

Senior career*
Years	Team	Apps	(Gls)
2011–2013	New Radiant		
2014–2015	BG Spots		
2016	United Victory		
2017	Maziya		
2017	G Dh Thinadhoo FT		
2018–	United Victory		

International career^{‡}
2021–	Maldives	2	(0)
- * Club domestic league appearances and goals ‡ National team caps and goals as of 15 June 2021

Ali Haisam (born 4 April 1992) nicknamed "Chumpu", is a Maldivian footballer who plays as a forward for United Victory and Maldives national team.

== Club career ==
Haisam started his career at New Radiant at the age of 18 in 2011. He later joined BG Spots Club before joining United Victory in 2016.

In 2017, Haisam signed for Maziya and won Malé League with them in that season. Due to lack of game time, he left Maziya to play for G Dh Thinadhoo Football Team for the remaining half of the season and helped the Minivan Championship side to secure top four of 2017 Dhivehi Premier League and qualify for the 2017 President's Cup.

In 2018, Haisam joined United Victory for the second time.

== International career ==
In May 2021, Haisam received a call-up from the Football Association of Maldives to play in the 2022 FIFA World Cup qualifiers against China, Syria and Philippines. He made his senior international debut on 11 June 2021, in a 5–0 defeat against China, playing in the starting eleven.

In his second game in Maldives shirt, he assisted the only goal by Maldives for Ali Fasir to equalize against Philippines, which resulted Maldives to seal a direct spot in the 2023 Asian Cup qualifying third round.
