= 2017 Malé League =

Malé League
- Season: 2017
- Champions: Maziya
- Matches: 56
- Goals: 134 (2.39 per match)

The 2017 Malé League is the seventh season of the Malé League, the top division of Maldivian football under the latest update of the Maldivian football league system. The league was made up of the 8 clubs.

== Format ==
All eight teams play against each other in Two Round Format. Team with most total points at the end of the season will be crowned as Malé League champion and qualified to the AFC Cup. Top four teams qualify for the Dhivehi Premier League and the President's Cup. Bottom four teams play the Malé League qualification with the champion and the runner-up of Second Division.

Top four teams of Malé League qualification after one round will play in the next year's Malé League. Bottom two will be relegated to Second Division.

== Teams ==
A total of 8 teams will be contesting in the league.

=== Teams and their divisions ===
Note: Table lists clubs in alphabetical order.

Team	Division
Eagles	Maafannu
Club Green Streets	Machchangolhi
Valencia	Machchangolhi
Maziya	West Maafannu
New Radiant	Henveiru
TC Sports Club	Henveiru
United Victory	Galolhu
Victory	Galolhu

=== Personnel ===
Note: Flags indicate national team as has been defined under FIFA eligibility rules. Players may hold more than one non-FIFA nationality.

Team	Head coach	Captain
Eagles	(Maldives) Ibrahim Asverd	(Maldives) Imran Nasheed
Green Streets	(Maldives) Sobah Mohamed	(Maldives) Faruhad Ismail
Valencia	(Maldives) Ahmed Mujuthaba	(Maldives) Shafiu Ahmed
Maziya	(North Macedonia) Marjan Sekulovski	(Maldives) Asadhulla Abdulla
New Radiant	(Spain) Óscar Bruzón	(Maldives) Imran Mohamed
TC Sports Club	(Maldives) Mohamed Nizam	(Maldives) Ali Nafiu
United Victory	(Maldives) Mohamed Nazeeh	(Maldives) Hussain Shimaz
Victory	(Maldives) Ali Suzain	(Maldives) Ismail Easa

=== Coaching changes ===
Team	Outgoing Head Coach	Manner of departure	Date of departure	Incoming Head Coach	Date of appointment
United Victory	(Maldives) Ahmed Athif	Resign	21 March 2017	(Maldives) Mohamed Nazeeh	27 March 2017
New Radiant	(Portugal) Bernardo Tavares	Sacked	24 June 2017	(Spain) Óscar Bruzón	26 June 2017

== Foreign players ==
Players name in bold indicates the player is registered during the mid-season transfer window.

Club	Visa 1	Visa 2	Visa 3	Visa 4 (Asian)	Former Players
Club Eagles	(Egypt) Mohamed Magdi	(Brazil) **Anderson Bina D'Souza**	(Egypt) Mahmoud Sayed	(Sri Lanka) Sujan Perera	(Netherlands) Donovan Deekman
Club Green Streets	(Ukraine) Petro Kovalchuk	(Ukraine) Dmytro Zhdanov	(Ukraine) Sobol Illia	(Japan) Jun Kochi	
Club Valencia	(Nigeria) Chizi Kaka Chinda	(Nigeria) Godfrey West Omodu	(Nigeria) Prince Chinonye		
Maziya	(Serbia) Aleksandar Rakić		(Serbia) Miloš Kovačević	(Kyrgyzstan) Pavel Matiash	(Romania) Andrei Cordoș
New Radiant	(Spain) Adrián Gallardo Valdés	(Spain) **Candela**	(Montenegro) Stevan Marković	(Lebanon) **Hussein El-Dor**	(Netherlands) Djamel Leeflang (Japan) Keisuke Ogawa
TC Sports Club	(Saint Vincent and the Grenadines) Cornelius Stewart	(Egypt) Easa El-Maghrabi		(Nepal) Kiran Chemjong	
United Victory	(Croatia) Tihomir Živković	(Nigeria) Kudus Omolade Kelani	(Serbia) Đorđe Vukobrat	(Kyrgyzstan) Ruslan Amirov	
Victory	(Bulgaria) Velichko Velichkov	(Croatia) Andrej Kerić	(Egypt) Mostafa Seddik	(Syria) Mahmoud Al-Youssef	

== League table ==
Pos	Team	Pld	W	D	L	GF	GA	GD	Pts	Qualification or relegation
1	Maziya (C)	14	8	3	3	18	8	+10	27	2017 Dhivehi Premier League
2	Green Streets	14	8	3	3	20	11	+9	27	2017 Dhivehi Premier League
3	New Radiant	14	8	3	3	22	15	+7	27	2017 Dhivehi Premier League
4	TC Sports Club	14	6	4	4	30	19	+11	22	2017 Dhivehi Premier League
5	Eagles	14	6	4	4	14	7	+7	22	Malé League qualification
6	Victory	14	6	4	4	19	18	+1	22	Malé League qualification
7	Valencia	14	1	3	10	7	26	−19	6	Malé League qualification
8	United Victory	14	1	0	13	4	30	−26	3	Malé League qualification

(C) Champions

== Season summary ==
=== Round One & Two ===
Home \ Away	EAG	GRS	VLC	MAZ	NRA	TCS	UVI	VIC
Eagles		0–1	1–0	0–4	1–1	0–0	1–0	0–0
Green Streets	2–0		1–1	1–0	3–0	1–1	3–0	1–2
Valencia	0–3	1–1		0–0	0–1	3–6	1–0	0–2
Maziya	1–0	3–0	3–0		1–1	0–0	3–0	0–1
New Radiant	0–1	2–1	1–0	1–2		4–3	2–0	1–1
TC Sports	1–0	1–3	3–0	0–3	1–2		6–0	4–1
United Victory	0–2	0–1	1–0	0–1	0–3	0–2		2–3
Victory	1–1	0–1	3–1	0–1	1–3	2–2	2–1	

Updated to match(es) played on unknown. Source:
Legend: Blue = home team win; Yellow = draw; Red = away team win.

Note 1: The notion of home and away fixtures in the 2017 Malé League is moot as all games are played at National Football Stadium. As such, for the purpose of this table, the first result chronologically has been deemed that team's "home" game and the second the "away" game.

=== Positions by round ===
The table lists the positions of teams after each week of matches.

Team \ Round	1	2	3	4	5	6	7	8	9	10	11	12	13	14
Eagles	5	4	4	3	4	5	4	4	4	4	3	3	4	5
Green Streets	2	3	5	5	3	4	3	3	3	3	4	4	3	2
Valencia	6	6	7	7	8	8	8	8	8	8	8	8	8	7
Maziya	3	1	1	1	1	1	1	1	1	1	1	1	1	1
New Radiant	4	2	2	2	2	2	2	2	2	2	2	2	2	3
TC Sports	1	5	3	4	5	3	5	5	5	6	6	6	6	4
United Victory	8	8	8	8	6	7	7	7	7	7	7	7	7	8
Victory	7	7	6	6	7	6	6	6	6	5	5	5	5	6

Last updated:

=== Matches ===
==== First round ====
A total of 28 matches will be played in this round.

24 February 2017 1	Maziya	1–0	Eagles	National Football Stadium, Malé
22:00	Asadhulla 53'	[ Report]

25 February 2017 2	Victory	0–1	Green Streets	National Football Stadium, Malé
21:00		[ Report]	22' A. Rasheed

3 March 2017 3	New Radiant	3–1	Victory	National Football Stadium, Malé
21:00	Akram 45+1'; Gallardo 68', 88'	[ Report]	84' Kerić

4 March 2017 4	Eagles	2–0	United Victory	National Football Stadium, Malé
16:00	Ansar 27'; Deekman 36'	[ Report]

5 March 2017 5	Valencia	1–1	Green Streets	National Football Stadium, Malé
16:00	Prince 41'	[ Report]	39' (pen.) Illia

9 March 2017 6	United Victory	0–3	New Radiant	National Football Stadium, Malé
16:00		[ Report]	50' Gallardo; 69' Marković; 89' Ali Fasir

9 March 2017 7	Maziya	3–0	Green Streets	National Football Stadium, Malé
21:00	Asadhulla 51' (pen.), 78'; Rakić 68'	[ Report]

10 March 2017 8	Eagles	1–1	Victory	National Football Stadium, Malé
16:00	Sameeh 5'	[ Report]	21' Easa

10 March 2017 9	TC Sports	3–0	Valencia	National Football Stadium, Malé
21:00	Shamweel 38'; Naiz 58'; Nafiu 67'	[ Report]

7 April 2017 10	TC Sports	2–0	United Victory	National Football Stadium, Malé
16:00	Nafiu 66', (penalty missed) 87'; Nasooh 90+4'	[ Report]

7 April 2017 11	New Radiant	1–0	Valencia	National Football Stadium, Malé
21:00	Gallardo 77'	[ Report]

12 April 2017 12	Eagles	3–0	Valencia	National Football Stadium, Malé
16:00	Ansar 2'; Nashid 29'; Naufal 52'	[ Report]

12 April 2017 13	TC Sports	2–2	Victory	National Football Stadium, Malé
21:00	Elmaghraby (penalty missed) 28'; Naiz 44'; Stewart 85' (pen.)	[ Report]	34', 59' Kerić

13 April 2017 14	New Radiant	1–2	Maziya	National Football Stadium, Malé
16:00	Akram 45'	[ Report]	52' Rakić; 73' Shifaz

13 April 2017 15	United Victory	0–1	Green Streets	National Football Stadium, Malé
21:00		[ Report]	18' (pen.) Illia

23 April 2017 16	Eagles	0–2	Green Streets	National Football Stadium, Malé
16:00		[ Report]	46' (o.g.) Sifaau; 59' Illia

23 April 2017 17	United Victory	1–0	Valencia	National Football Stadium, Malé
21:00	Naavy 29'	[ Report]

24 April 2017 18	TC Sports	1–2	New Radiant	National Football Stadium, Malé
21:00	Mahudhee 67'	[ Report]	17' Gallardo; 57' Midhuhath

25 April 2017 19	Maziya	1–0	Victory	National Football Stadium, Malé
16:00	Rakić 47'	[ Report]

28 April 2017 20	TC Sports	1–0	Eagles	National Football Stadium, Malé
16:00	Stewart 15' (pen.)	[ Report]

28 April 2017 21	New Radiant	2–1	Green Streets	National Football Stadium, Malé
21:00	Abdulla 38'; Gallardo 56'	[ Report]	81' Zhdanov

29 April 2017 22	Maziya	1–0	United Victory	National Football Stadium, Malé
16:00	Asadhulla 80'	[ Report]

29 April 2017 23	Valencia	1–3	Victory	National Football Stadium, Malé
21:00	West 47'	[ Report]	30' Kerić; 59' Easa; 66' (o.g.) Shafiu

7 May 2017 24	United Victory	1–2	Victory	National Football Stadium, Malé
16:00	Živković 31'	[ Report]	45' Adhuham; 62' Riswan

7 May 2017 25	Eagles	1–0	New Radiant	National Football Stadium, Malé
21:00	Naim 44'	[ Report]

8 May 2017 26	TC Sports	1–3	Green Streets	National Football Stadium, Malé
16:00	Mahudhee 71'	[ Report]	3', 45' Illia; 80' Rizuhaan

8 May 2017 27	Maziya	3–0	Valencia	National Football Stadium, Malé
21:00	Asadhulla 17', 82' (penalty missed) 22'; Umair 38'	[ Report]

12 May 2017 28	Maziya	3–0	TC Sports	National Football Stadium, Malé
21:00	Umair 22'; Asadhulla 64', 88'	[ Report]

==== Second round ====
A total of 28 matches will be played in this round.

20 May 2017 29	Green Streets	1–1	TC Sports	National Football Stadium, Malé
16:00	Illia 30'	[ Report]	80' (pen.) Stewart

20 May 2017 30	New Radiant	1–0	Valencia	National Football Stadium, Malé
21:00	Fasir 48'	[ Report]

22 May 2017 31	Maziya	0–1	Victory	National Football Stadium, Malé
16:00		[ Report]	Seddik 39'

22 May 2017 32	Eagles	1–0	United Victory	National Football Stadium, Malé
21:00	Naufal 66'	[ Report]

25 May 2017 33	TC Sports	6–3	Valencia	National Football Stadium, Malé
16:00	Mahudhee 1', 8', 47'; Naiz 19'; Nafiu 44'; Ibrahim 73'	[ Report]	13', 33' Hamdhaan; 30' (pen.) Godfrey

26 May 2017 34	Victory	3–2	United Victory	National Football Stadium, Malé
16:00	Kerić 14', 89'; Adhuham 19'	[ Report]	71' Wahid; 76' Shafraz

26 May 2017 35	New Radiant	0–3	Green Streets	National Football Stadium, Malé
21:00		[ Report]	23', 29' A. Rasheed; 67' Ahmed

22 June 2017 36	Maziya	0–4	Eagles	National Football Stadium, Malé
22:00		[ Report]	50', 75', 90' Rizuvan; 84' Naim

23 June 2017 37	New Radiant	4–3	TC Sports	National Football Stadium, Malé
22:00	Naiz 40'; Stewart 50' (pen.), 60' (pen.)	[ Report]	20', 55' Fasir; 34' Hamza; 90+2' Gallardo

24 June 2017 38	Green Streets	1–1	Valencia	National Football Stadium, Malé
22:00	Illia 28'	[ Report]	10' (pen.) West

28 June 2017 39	Eagles	0–0	Victory	National Football Stadium, Malé
16:00		[ Report]

28 June 2017 40	Maziya	3–0	United Victory	National Football Stadium, Malé
21:00	Cordoș 8', 29'; Ashad 10'	[ Report]

3 July 2017 41	Eagles	1–0	Valencia	National Football Stadium, Malé
16:00	Nashid 14'	[ Report]

3 July 2017 42	Maziya	0–0	TC Sports	National Football Stadium, Malé
21:00		[ Report]

4 July 2017 43	New Radiant	2–0	United Victory	National Football Stadium, Malé
16:00	Gallardo 7'; Suhail 89'	[ Report]

4 July 2017 44	Green Streets	1–2	Victory	National Football Stadium, Malé
21:00	Ahmed 42'	[ Report]	58' (pen.) Easa; 90+2' Niyaz

8 July 2017 45	New Radiant	1–1	Victory	National Football Stadium, Malé
14:00	Gallardo 57'	[ Report]	73' Easa

8 July 2017 46	Green Streets	3–0	United Victory	National Football Stadium, Malé
21:00	A. Rasheed 30', 76'; Illia 90+1' (pen.)	[ Report]

9 July 2017 47	Maziya	0–0	Valencia	National Football Stadium, Malé
16:00		[ Report]

9 July 2017 48	Eagles	0–0	TC Sports	National Football Stadium, Malé
21:00		[ Report]

13 July 2017 49	Maziya	0–1	Green Streets	National Football Stadium, Malé
16:00		[ Report]	50' Illia

13 July 2017 50	New Radiant	1–1	Eagles	National Football Stadium, Malé
21:00	Gallardo 89' (pen.)	[ Report]	67' Naim

14 July 2017 51	TC Sports	6–0	United Victory	National Football Stadium, Malé
16:00	Samir 1', 40'; Stewart 53', 69'; Mahudhee 82'; Azzam 87'	[ Report]

14 July 2017 52	Victory	2–0	Valencia	National Football Stadium, Malé
21:00	Seddik 6'; Kerić 35'	[ Report]

18 July 2017 53	United Victory	0–1	Valencia	National Football Stadium, Malé
16:00		Report	75' Visam

18 July 2017 54	TC Sports	4–1	Victory	National Football Stadium, Malé
21:00	Mahudhee 32'; Ibrahim 55'; Azzam 80'; Stewart 82'	Report	75' Kerić

19 July 2017 55	Green Streets	1–0	Eagles	National Football Stadium, Malé
16:00	Nizam 5'	[ Report]

19 July 2017 56	Maziya	1–1	New Radiant	National Football Stadium, Malé
21:00	Amdhan 59'	[ Report]	2' Fazeel

== Season statistics ==
=== Hat-tricks ===
Player	For	Against	Result	Date	Ref
(Maldives) Ibrahim Mahudhee	TC Sports	Valencia	6–3 (2)	25 May 2017	
(Maldives) Ahmed Rizuvan	Eagles	Maziya	4–0 (2)	23 June 2017	

Note

(2) – Second round match

== 2018 Malé League qualification ==
=== Qualification league table ===
Pos	Team	Pld	W	D	L	GF	GA	GD	Pts	Qualification or relegation
1	Eagles	0	0	0	0	0	0	0	0	2018 Malé League
2	Victory	0	0	0	0	0	0	0	0	2018 Malé League
3	United Victory	0	0	0	0	0	0	0	0	2018 Malé League
4	Valencia	0	0	0	0	0	0	0	0	2018 Malé League
5	Zefrol	0	0	0	0	0	0	0	0	Relegated to 2018 Second Division
6	Kudahenveiru	0	0	0	0	0	0	0	0	Relegated to 2018 Second Division

Note! Zefrol & Kudahenveiru decided to withdraw before starting of the qualification. Therefore other teams automatically qualified to 2018 Malé League without playing the qualification Round.
