= 2017 Dhivehi Premier League =

Dhivehi Premier League
- Season: 2017
- Champions: New Radiant
- Matches: 56
- Goals: 185 (3.3 per match)
- Top goalscorer: (Maldives) Ali Ashfaq (13 goals)
- Biggest win: G. Dh. Thinadhoo 7–0 Green Streets
- Longest winning run: 12 games New Radiant
- Longest unbeaten run: 12 games New Radiant
- All statistics correct as of 8 December 2017.

The 2017 Dhivehi Premier League season is the third season of the Dhivehi Premier League, first according to its new format. The season features eight teams; four teams from 2017 Malé League and for teams from 2017 Minivan Championship, each playing 14 matches during the regular season.

== Qualified teams ==
Locations of the 2017 Dhivehi Premier League teams

Note: Table lists clubs in alphabetical order.

Team	Qualified format	Date qualified	Ref
A. A. Maalhos	Minivan Championship semi finalist	12 July 2017	
Green Streets	2017 Malé League top 4	18 July 2017	
Dh. Kudahuvadhoo	Minivan Championship semi finalist	12 July 2017	
G. Dh. Thinadhoo	Minivan Championship semi finalist	13 July 2017	
Maziya	2017 Malé League top 4	3 July 2017	
New Radiant	2017 Malé League top 4	8 July 2017	
Sh. Milandhoo	Minivan Championship semi finalist	13 July 2017	
TC Sports	2017 Malé League top 4	19 July 2017	

=== Personnel ===
Note: Flags indicate national team as has been defined under FIFA eligibility rules. Players may hold more than one non-FIFA nationality.

Team	Head coach	Captain
A. A. Maalhos	(Maldives) Ali Nisthar Mohamed	(Maldives)
Green Streets	(Maldives) Sobah Mohamed	(Maldives) Faruhad Ismail
Dh. Kudahuvadhoo	(Maldives) Mohamed Shiyaz	(Maldives)
G. Dh. Thinadhoo	(Maldives) Ali Suzain	(Maldives)
Maziya	(Maldives) Ismail Mahfooz	(Maldives) Asadhulla Abdulla
New Radiant	(Spain) Óscar Bruzón	(Maldives) Imran Mohamed
Sh. Milandhoo	(Maldives) Mohamed Nasir	(Maldives)
TC Sports	(Maldives) Mohamed Nizam	(Maldives) Ali Nafiu

=== Coaching changes ===
Team	Outgoing Head Coach	Incoming Head Coach
G. Dh. Thinadhoo	(Spain) Álvarez Sánchez	(Spain) Juan Manuel Martinez Saez
G. Dh. Thinadhoo	(Spain) Juan Manuel Martinez Saez	(Maldives) Ali Suzain
Maziya	(North Macedonia) Marjan Sekulovski	(Maldives) Ismail Mahfooz

== Foreign players ==
Club	Visa 1	Visa 2	Visa 3	Visa 4 (Asian)
A. A. Maalhos	(Spain) Angel Carrasco Muñoz			(Pakistan) Saqib Hanif
Green Streets	(Ukraine) Petro Kovalchuk	(Ukraine) Ilya Sobol	(Slovakia) Viliam Macko	(Japan) Jun Kochi
Dh. Kudahuvadhoo	Afonja jibola			
G. Dh. Thinadhoo	(Spain) Pecharroman Alain			(Kyrgyzstan) Ruslan Dzhanybekov
Maziya	(Serbia) Miloš Kovačević	(Croatia) Andrej Kerić	(Bosnia and Herzegovina) Bojan Mihajlovic	(Syria) Mahmoud Al-Youssef
New Radiant	(Spain) Adrián Gallardo Valdés	(Spain) Candela	(Montenegro) Stevan Marković	(Lebanon) Hussein Eldor
Sh. Milandhoo				
TC Sports	(Saint Vincent and the Grenadines) Cornelius Stewart	(Egypt) Easa El-Maghrabi	(Egypt) Halil El-Bezawy	(Nepal) Kiran Chemjong

== League table ==
Pos	Team	Pld	W	D	L	GF	GA	GD	Pts	Qualification
1	New Radiant (C)	14	13	0	1	44	9	+35	39	2018 AFC Cup group stage and 2017 President's Cup
2	TC Sports	14	10	2	2	31	14	+17	32	2017 President's Cup
3	Maziya	14	8	3	3	30	10	+20	27	2017 President's Cup
4	G. Dh. Thinadhoo	14	5	3	6	23	18	+5	18	2017 President's Cup
5	Green Streets	14	5	1	8	15	28	−13	16	
6	Sh. Milandhoo	14	3	5	6	18	26	−8	14	
7	A. A. Maalhos	14	2	3	9	18	40	−22	9	
8	Dh. Kudahuvadhoo	14	0	3	11	6	40	−34	3	

(C) Champions

== Season summary ==
=== Round One & Two ===
Home \ Away	MAL	CGS	KHD	THI	MAZ	NRA	MIL	TCS
A. A. Maalhos		2–1	3–3	1–2	0–6	1–7	5–1	0–1
Green Streets	5–0		1–0	0–7	0–3	0–3	1–1	1–4
Dh. Kudahuvadhoo	2–2	0–1		0–0	0–3	0–3	0–3	0–4
G. Dh. Thinadhoo	1–0	1–2	2–0		1–1	1–3	2–3	2–3
Maziya	3–0	2–0	4–0	1–1		0–2	3–3	1–2
New Radiant	3–0	1–0	6–0	2–1	0–2		7–1	3–2
Sh. Milandhoo	2–2	1–2	2–0	1–2	0–1	0–1		0–0
TC Sports	3–2	3–1	6–1	1–0	1–0	1–3	0–0	

Legend: Blue = home team win; Yellow = draw; Red = away team win.

Note 1: The notion of home and away fixtures in the 2017 Dhivehi Premier League is moot as all games are played at National Football Stadium. As such, for the purpose of this table, the first result chronologically has been deemed that team's "home" game and the second the "away" game.

=== Positions by round ===
The table lists the positions of teams after each week of matches.

Team ╲ Round	1	2	3	4	5	6	7	8	9	10	11	12	13	14
A. A. Maalhos	6	7	6	7	7	7	7	7	6	6	6	7	7	7
Green Streets	3	2	4	3	4	4	4	4	4	4	4	4	5	5
Dh. Kudahuvadhoo	8	8	8	8	8	8	8	8	8	8	8	8	8	8
G. Dh. Thinadhoo	4	5	5	5	5	5	5	5	5	5	5	5	4	4
Maziya	1	1	1	1	1	2	2	2	3	3	3	3	3	3
New Radiant	2	4	3	2	2	1	1	1	1	1	1	1	1	1
Sh. Milandhoo	5	6	7	6	6	6	6	6	7	7	7	6	6	6
TC Sports	7	3	2	4	3	3	3	3	2	2	2	2	2	2

=== Matches ===
==== First round ====
A total of 28 matches will be played in this round.

===== Week 1 =====
4 August 2017 1	Dh. Kudahuvadhoo	0–4	Maziya	National Football Stadium, Malé
21:00	Christian (yellow card) 50'; Shaheem (yellow card) 87'	Report	1' Asadhulla; 56', 70' Kerić; 73' (o.g.) I. Rasheed

5 August 2017 2	TC Sports	1–3	New Radiant	National Football Stadium, Malé
21:00	Stewart 49' (yellow card) 56'; Zaad (yellow card) 76'	Report	48' Gallardo; 74' Ashfaq; 81' Fasir

6 August 2017 3	Green Streets	2–1	Sh. Milandhoo	National Football Stadium, Malé
16:00	A. Rasheed 5'; Sobol 89'	Report	(yellow card) 27' Visaal; 63' Fathuhee

6 August 2017 4	G. Dh. Thinadhoo	1–0	A. A. Maalhos	National Football Stadium, Malé
21:00	Jorge Caceido Rodriguez (yellow card) 25'; Imran (yellow card) 67'; Avila 73'; Zubair (yellow card) 90'	Report	(yellow card) 22' Wahid

===== Week 2 =====
11 August 2017 5	Sh. Milandhoo	2–2	A. A. Maalhos	National Football Stadium, Malé
16:00	Ilham (yellow card) 18'; Asrar (yellow card) 22'; Ishan 86', 90'	Report	28' Muñoz; 69' Naif

11 August 2017 6	Green Streets	2–1	G. Dh. Thinadhoo	National Football Stadium, Malé
21:00	Sobol 36' (yellow card) 62'; A. Rasheed (yellow card) 55'; Shafiu 87'; Faruhad (yellow card) 87'	Report	46' (yellow card) 76' Avila

12 August 2017 7	Maziya	2–0	New Radiant	National Football Stadium, Malé
16:00	Bojan 9'; Asadhulla (yellow card) 40'; Umair 41'; Ashad (yellow card) 48'	Report	(yellow card) 20' Stevan; (yellow card) 41' Akram

12 August 2017 8	Dh. Kudahuvadhoo	1–6	TC Sports	National Football Stadium, Malé
21:00	Adam Shaheem 57'	Report	13' Naiz Hassan; 17' Cornelius Stewart; 44' Abdulla Haneef; 46', 58', 73' Ali Nafiu

===== Week 3 =====
18 August 2017 9	New Radiant	1–0	Green Streets	National Football Stadium, Malé
16:00	Ali Ashfaq 43'	Report

18 August 2017 10	Dh. Kudahuvadhoo	2–2	A. A. Maalhos	National Football Stadium, Malé
21:00	Ibrahum Ushamath 5'; Adam Shaheem 50'	Report	33' (pen.), 74' Muñoz

19 August 2017 11	TC Sports	1–0	G. Dh. Thinadhoo	National Football Stadium, Malé
16:00	Cornelius Stewart 38'	Report

19 August 2017 12	Maziya	1–0	Sh. Milandhoo	National Football Stadium, Malé
21:00	Andrej Kerić 82'	Report

===== Week 4 =====
23 August 2017 13	TC Sports	0–0	Sh. Milandhoo	National Football Stadium, Malé
16:00		Report

23 August 2017 14	Maziya	1–1	G. Dh. Thinadhoo	National Football Stadium, Malé
21:00	Hussain Niyaz Mohamed 90+2'	Report	82' Ahmed Niyaz

24 August 2017 15	Dh. Kudahuvadhoo	0–1	Green Streets	National Football Stadium, Malé
16:00		Report	45+1' Viliam Macko

24 August 2017 16	New Radiant	3–0	A. A. Maalhos	National Football Stadium, Malé
21:00	Ali Ashfaq 28', 61'; Ali Fasir 29'	Report

===== Week 5 =====
10 September 2017 17	Dh. Kudahuvadhoo	0–2	G. Dh. Thinadhoo	National Football Stadium, Malé
16:00		Report	31' Imran Nasheed; 86' Jorge Caceido Rodriguez

10 September 2017 18	New Radiant	1–0	Sh. Milandhoo	National Football Stadium, Malé
21:00	Adrián Gallardo Valdés 66' (pen.)	Report

11 September 2017 19	TC Sports	3–2	A. A. Maalhos	National Football Stadium, Malé
16:00	Cornelius Stewart 21'; Ibrahim Mahudhee 45+2'; Ali Nafiu 53'	Report	7', 80' (pen.) Ángel Carrascosa Muñoz

11 September 2017 20	Maziya	2–0*	Green Streets	National Football Stadium, Malé
21:00	Mohamed Umair 22'	Report
Note: * Match abandoned after 53 minutes, Maziya leading 1–0. Final result later declared as such

===== Week 6 =====
16 September 2017 21	Maziya	0–1	TC Sports	National Football Stadium, Malé
16:00		Report	2' Ibrahim Waheed Hassan

16 September 2017 22	Green Streets	5–0	A. A. Maalhos	National Football Stadium, Malé
21:00	Ibrahim Rizuhan 10'; Ahmed Nizam 45', 58'; Petro Kovalchuk 57'; Ali Shamis 90+?'	Report

17 September 2017 23	Dh. Kudahuvadhoo	0–6	New Radiant	National Football Stadium, Malé
16:00		Report	18' Adrián Gallardo Valdés; 24' Ali Fasir; 62', 72' Ali Ashfaq; 75' Hassan Adhuham; 84' Stevan Marković

17 September 2017 24	Sh. Milandhoo	1–2	G. Dh. Thinadhoo	National Football Stadium, Malé
21:00	Adam Imran 25'	Report	?' Mohamed Riswan; 90+3' Ahmed Rizuvan

===== Week 7 =====
22 September 2017 25	New Radiant	2–1	G. Dh. Thinadhoo	National Football Stadium, Malé
16:00	Candela 14'; Adrián Gallardo Valdés 69'	Report	36' Jorge Caceido Rodriguez

22 September 2017 26	Dh. Kudahuvadhoo	0–2*	Sh. Milandhoo	National Football Stadium, Malé
21:00		Report	?' Ishan Ibrahim ?' Ibrahim Shiyam
Note: * Match abandoned after 76 minutes, Milandhoo leading 2–0. Final result later declared as such

23 September 2017 27	Maziya	3–0	A. A. Maalhos	National Football Stadium, Malé
16:00	Abdulla Ibrahim 34' (o.g.); Andrej Kerić 53'; Mohamed Umair 90+?'	Report

23 September 2017 28	TC Sports	3–1	Green Streets	National Football Stadium, Malé
21:00	Naiz Hassan 57'; Khalil Gamal Khalil Elbezawy 58'; Cornelius Stewart ?'	Report	74' Ahmed Nizam

==== Second round ====
A total of 28 matches will be played in this round.

===== Week 8 =====
14 October 2017 29	TC Sports	3–2	G. Dh. Thinadhoo	National Football Stadium, Malé
16:00	Cornelius Stewart 51', 57'; Ibrahim Mahudhee 78'	Report	64' Ahmed Rizuvan; 76' Alexander Hernandez Avila

14 October 2017 30	Maziya	3–0	Dh. Kudahuvadhoo	National Football Stadium, Malé
21:00	Mohamed Umair 75' (pen.), 85'; Ismail Easa 88'	Report

15 October 2017 31	New Radiant	7–1	Sh. Milandhoo	National Football Stadium, Malé
16:00	Ali Fasir 27', ?', 86'; Adrián Gallardo Valdés 58', 73'; Ali Ashfaq 61', 77'	Report	37' Adam Imran

15 October 2017 32	Green Streets	1–2	A. A. Maalhos	National Football Stadium, Malé
21:00	Mohamed Nazaam 20'	Report	12', 49' (pen.) Angel Carrasco Muñoz

===== Week 9 =====
20 October 2017 33	Sh. Milandhoo	1–5	A. A. Maalhos	National Football Stadium, Malé
16:00	Ibrahim Saeed 34'	Report	2', 10', 36' Angel Carrasco Muñoz; 20' Ahmed Arif; 52' Ali Waseem

20 October 2017 34	New Radiant	3–0	Green Streets	National Football Stadium, Malé
21:00	Hamza Mohamed 14'; Ali Fasir 64'; Mohamed Rasheed 85'	Report

21 October 2017 35	G. Dh. Thinadhoo	0–0	Dh. Kudahuvadhoo	National Football Stadium, Malé
16:00		Report

21 October 2017 36	Maziya	1–2	TC Sports	National Football Stadium, Malé
21:00	Ismail Easa 90+3'	Report	45+?' Ibrahim Waheed Hassan; 84' Ibrahim Mahudhee

===== Week 10 =====
25 October 2017 37	Maziya	1–1	G. Dh. Thinadhoo	National Football Stadium, Malé
16:00	Mohamed Umair 62'	Report	64' Ahmed Numaan

25 October 2017 38	TC Sports	4–0	Dh. Kudahuvadhoo	National Football Stadium, Malé
21:00	Abdulla Haneef 5'; Naiz Hassan 41'; Cornelius Stewart 45'; Ibrahim Mahudhee 60'	Report

26 October 2017 39	Green Streets	1–1	Sh. Milandhoo	National Football Stadium, Malé
16:00	Ahmed Rizuhan 48'	Report	87' Ishan Ibrahim

26 October 2017 40	New Radiant	7–1	A. A. Maalhos	National Football Stadium, Malé
21:00	Ali Ashfaq 5', 46', 78'; Ahmed Abdulla 50'; Ibrahim Fazeel 67'; Ali Fasir 76', 89'	Report	17' Ahmed Arif

===== Week 11 =====
30 October 2017 41	Green Streets	1–0	Dh. Kudahuvadhoo	National Football Stadium, Malé
16:00	Viliam Macko 71'	Report

30 October 2017 42	New Radiant	3–1	G. Dh. Thinadhoo	National Football Stadium, Malé
21:00	Candela 20'; Ali Ashfaq 40'; Adrián Gallardo Valdés 68'	Report	65' Jose Alexander Hernandez Avila

31 October 2017 43	Maziya	6–0	A. A. Maalhos	National Football Stadium, Malé
16:00	Mohamed Umair 5', 6', 81' (pen.); Andrej Kerić 10'; Yasfaadh Habeeb ?'; Ashad Ali 70'	Report

31 October 2017 44	TC Sports	0–0	Sh. Milandhoo	National Football Stadium, Malé
21:00		Report

===== Week 12 =====
4 November 2017 45	Maziya	3–3	Sh. Milandhoo	National Football Stadium, Malé
16:00	Miloš Kovačević 23'; Andrej Kerić 34'; Ashad Ali 37'	Report	54', 57' Abdulla Misbah; 77' Ishan Ibrahim

4 November 2017 46	TC Sports	1–0	A. A. Maalhos	National Football Stadium, Malé
21:00	Ibrahim Mahudhee 2'	Report

5 November 2017 47	New Radiant	3–0	Dh. Kudahuvadhoo	National Football Stadium, Malé
16:00	Adrián Gallardo Valdés 51' (pen.); Ali Fasir 65'; Stevan Marković 69'	Report

5 November 2017 48	Green Streets	0–7	G. Dh. Thinadhoo	National Football Stadium, Malé
21:00		Report	8' Ansar Ibrahim; 20', 30' (pen.), 31' Jose Alexander Hernandez Avila; 51', 54' Ahmed Rizuvan; 87' Ali Aisham

===== Week 13 =====
19 November 2017 49	New Radiant	3–2	TC Sports	National Football Stadium, Malé
16:00	Ali Fasir 2', 73'; Adrián Gallardo Valdés 6'	Report	78', 84' Ibrahim Mahudhee

19 November 2017 50	Maziya	3–0	Green Streets	National Football Stadium, Malé
21:00	Bojan Mihajlović 45+?'; Ismail Easa 53' (pen.); Ashad Ali 71'	Report

20 November 2017 51	G. Dh. Thinadhoo	2–1	A. A. Maalhos	National Football Stadium, Malé
16:00	Ahmed Rizuvan 43'; Ali Haisham 90+7'	Report	62' Angel Carrasco Muñoz

20 November 2017 52	Sh. Milandhoo	3–0	Dh. Kudahuvadhoo	National Football Stadium, Malé
21:00	Ismail Fathuhee 7'; Adam Imran 45'; Ibrahim Saeed 60'	Report

===== Week 14 =====
25 November 2017 53	A. A. Maalhos	3–3	Dh. Kudahuvadhoo	National Football Stadium, Malé
16:00	Ibrahim Naif 10'; Ahmed Arif 45'; Angel Carrasco Muñoz 81'	Report	28' Abdul Haliq; 54' Christian Dodzi Torsu; 55' Adam Shaheem

25 November 2017 54	G. Dh. Thinadhoo	2–3	Sh. Milandhoo	National Football Stadium, Malé
21:00	Ahmed Rizuvan 7'; Jorge Caceido Rodriguez 27'	Report	3', 19', 59' Ishan Ibrahim

26 November 2017 55	TC Sports	4–1	Green Streets	National Football Stadium, Malé
16:00	Nashaah Ahmed 31', 58'; Cornelius Stewart 48'; Mohamed Ajufaan 68'	Report	13' Ahmed Hassan

26 November 2017 56	New Radiant	2–0	Maziya	National Football Stadium, Malé
21:00	Adrián Gallardo Valdés 53'; Ali Ashfaq 86'	Report

== Season statistics ==
=== Top scorers ===
Rank	Player	Club	Goals
1	(Maldives) Ali Ashfaq	New Radiant	13
2	(Maldives) Ali Fasir	New Radiant	12
2	(Spain) Angel Carrasco Muñoz	Maalhos	12
4	(Spain) Adrián Gallardo Valdés	New Radiant	10
5	(Saint Vincent and the Grenadines) Cornelius Stewart	TC Sports	9
6	(Maldives) Mohamed Umair	Maziya	8
7	(Maldives) Ishan Ibrahim	Milandhoo	7
7	(Maldives) Ibrahim Mahudhee	TC Sports	7
7	(Panama) Jose Alexander Hernandez Avila	Thinadhoo	7
10	(Maldives) Ahmed Rizuvan	Thinadhoo	6
10	(Croatia) Andrej Kerić	Maziya	6

=== Hat-tricks ===
Player	For	Against	Result	Date
(Maldives) Ali Nafiu	TC Sports	Kudahuvadhoo	6–1	12 August 2017
(Maldives) Ali Fasir	New Radiant	Milandhoo	7–1	15 October 2017
(Spain) Angel Carrasco Muñoz	Maalhos	Milandhoo	5–1	20 October 2017
(Maldives) Ali Ashfaq	New Radiant	Maalhos	7–1	26 October 2017
(Maldives) Mohamed Umair	Maziya	Maalhos	6–0	31 October 2017
(Panama) Jose Alexander Hernandez Avila	Thinadhoo	Green Streets	7–0	5 November 2017
(Maldives) Ishan Ibrahim	Milandhoo	Thinadhoo	3–2	25 November 2017
