= 2017 President's Cup (Maldives) final =

2017 President's Cup final
- Event: 2017 President's Cup
| New Radiant | TBA |
- Date: 15 December 2017
- Venue: National Football Stadium, Malé

The 2017 President's Cup (Maldives) final was the 67th Final of the Maldives President's Cup.

== Route to the final ==
=== New Radiant ===
| Round | Team 1 | Score | Team 2 | Ref |
|---|---|---|---|---|
| F Qual. | New Radiant | 1–1 (4–2 p) | TC Sports | |

=== TC Sports ===
| Round | Team 1 | Score | Team 2 | Ref |
|---|---|---|---|---|
| F Qual. | New Radiant | 1–1 (4–2 p) | TC Sports | |
| SF | TC Sports | 2–0 | Maziya | |

== Match ==
=== Details ===
15 December 2017
21:00

| New Radiant | 3–0 | TC Sports |
|---|---|---|
| Fasir 70' (pen.); Fazeel 87', 90+4' | Report |

National Football Stadium, Male'
Attendance: 1,900

| New Radiant | TC Sports |

| GK | 25 | (Maldives) Imran Mohamed (c) |
| RB | 8 | (Maldives) Rilwan Waheed | | (substituted off) 59' |
| CB | 5 | (Lebanon) Hussein El-Dor |
| CB | 13 | (Maldives) Akram Abdul Ghanee | (yellow card) 58' |
| LB | 4 | (Maldives) Ahmed Abdulla | (yellow card) 45+1' | (substituted off) 50' |
| DM | 6 | (Spain) Candela |
| CM | 10 | (Maldives) Hamza Mohamed |
| RM | 16 | (Maldives) Abdulla Midhuhath Fahmy |
| LM | 7 | (Maldives) Ali Fasir |
| AM | 36 | (Maldives) Ibrahim Fazeel |
| CF | 12 | (Maldives) Ali Ashfaq | (yellow card) 100' |
Substitutes:
| DF | 14 | (Maldives) Ahmed Nuhaadh |
| DF | 19 | (Maldives) Mohamed Rasheed | | (substituted in) 50' |
| DF | 20 | (Maldives) Farooq Ismail |
| FW | 21 | (Maldives) Hassan Adhuham | | (substituted off) 59' |
| GK | 22 | (Maldives) Mohamed Faisal |
| GK | 24 | (Maldives) Abdulla Ziyazan |
| MF | 27 | (Maldives) Ali Shaamiu |
| MF | 28 | (Maldives) Solah |
| MF | 37 | (Maldives) Mohamed Sadin Abdul Hannan |
Manager:
(Spain) Óscar Bruzón

| GK | 13 | (Nepal) Kiran Chemjong |
| RB | 24 | (Maldives) Ahmed Rilwan | (yellow card) 38' |
| CB | 2 | (Egypt) Easa El-Maghrabi |
| CB | 4 | (Maldives) Abdulla Haneef (c) | (yellow card) 70' |
| LB | 16 | (Maldives) Ahmed Farrah | (yellow card) 15' |
| DM | 21 | (Maldives) Mohamed Azzam | (yellow card) 96' |
| CM | 17 | (Maldives) Ibrahim Waheed Hassan | | (substituted off) 49' |
| RM | 8 | (Egypt) Halil El-Bezawy | (yellow card) 85' |
| AM | 19 | (Maldives) Naiz Hassan |
| LM | 9 | (Saint Vincent and the Grenadines) Cornelius Stewart | (yellow card) 6' |
| CF | 7 | (Maldives) Ibrahim Mahudhee | (yellow card) 110' | (substituted off) 120' |
Substitutes:
| GK | 1 | (Maldives) Ibrahim Nadheem Adam | | (substituted in) 49' |
| DF | 6 | (Maldives) Muruthala Adnan | | (substituted in) 77' |
| FW | 11 | (Maldives) Nashaah Ahmed | | (substituted in) 77' |
| DF | 12 | (Maldives) Mohamed Samir | | (substituted in) 77' |
| FW | 14 | (Maldives) Ali Nafiu | | (substituted in) 77' |
| FW | 23 | (Maldives) Ahmed Suhail | | (substituted in) 120' |
| DF | 26 | (Maldives) Mohamed Ajufaan | | (substituted in) 77' |
| MF | 30 | (Maldives) Akmal Mohamed | | (substituted in) 77' |
| MF | 40 | (Maldives) Ali Nasooh Rasheed | | (substituted in) 77' |
Manager:
(Maldives) Mohamed Nizam

Assistant referees:
Kilar Ladsavong (Laos)
Somphavanh Louanglath (Laos)
Fourth official:
Khamsing Xaiyavongsy (Laos)

Match rules

- 90 minutes.
- 30 minutes of extra-time if necessary.
- Penalty shoot-out if scores still level.
- Maximum of three substitutions.

== See also ==
- 2016 President's Cup (Maldives)
