= Haisham Hassan =

Maldivian footballer

Personal information
- Full name: Haisham Hassan
- Date of birth: 21 July 1999 (age 27)
- Place of birth: Eydhafushi, Maldives
- Position: Left back

Team information
- Current team: Maziya S&RC
- Number: 44

Youth career
- 2017–2019: Eagles

Senior career*
Years	Team	Apps	(Gls)
2017	Eydhafushi	?	(1)
2018–2022	Eagles	2	(0)
2022-	Maziya S&RC	6	(0)

International career^{‡}
2017	Maldives U19	4	(0)
2019–	Maldives U23	3	(0)
2019–	Maldives	8	(0)
- * Club domestic league appearances and goals as of 18 May 2024 @ 13:11PM(AEST) ‡ National team caps and goals as of 23:00, 15 June 2021 (UTC+5)

Haisham Hassan (Dhivehi: ހައިޝަމް ހަސަން; born 21 July 1999) is a Maldivian professional footballer for Maziya S&RC and the Maldives national team. He plays mainly as a left back, but can also operate as a left winger.

He started his football career playing for his island team Eydhafushi in the 2017 Minivan Championship and was called up for the national under-19 team later that year, for the 2018 AFC U-19 Championship qualification. Following the qualification, he joined Club Eagles youth team in the same year, before making his first team debut for the team at the age of 18 in 2018.

Haisham Hassan made his first full appearance for Maldives in 2019.

== Club career ==
=== Eydhafushi ===
Haisham began his football career at the age of 17, playing for hometown club Eydhafushi in the 2017 Minivan Championship. He made his debut in their first match against Dharavandhoo on 6 April 2017, as a second half substitute, scoring the only goal in the last minutes to secure a narrow 1-0 victory at home. During the post match interview, Eydhafushi coach Mohamed Zahid praised Haisham's performance, saying that he will become a star for Maldives national team if he continues to play like this.

=== Eagles ===
==== Youth ====
Haisham was introduced as a Club Eagles under-21 player for the 2017 FAM Youth Championship and played a vital role to help his side win the Youth Championship for third consecutive time, playing every minute of the championship. He also scored his penalty in the shoot-out where they won the final against Maziya.

==== Senior ====
Haisham had his first professional contract on 12 January 2018, signing a two-year deal with Club Eagles. Eagles stated that he will be the replacement for their former player Mujuthaaz Mohamed who joined Maziya for the 2018 season.

On 25 February 2018, Haisham made his professional debut in their first game of the season against Victory Sports Club in 2018 Malé League, where they won by 4-1.

== International career ==
In July 2019, Haisham was named in the senior squad for the first time in Petar Segrt's 20-man squad participating in the 2019 Indian Ocean Island Games. He made his only appearance in the last group stage match, playing the full 90 minutes in the 3–1 loss to Mayotte.

One month later, in late August, Haisham was called up for the Maldives squad ahead of their World Cup qualifier matches against Guam and China PR. Haisham made his full Maldives debut against Guam on 5 September, where they won 1–0 in Dededo.

== Career statistics ==
=== Club ===
As of match played 17 September 2017

Club performance			League			Cup			League Cup			Continental			Other			Total			Discipline	
Club	League	Season	App.	Gls.	Asst.	App.	Gls.	Asst.	App.	Gls.	Asst.	App.	Gls.	Asst.	App.	Gls.	Asst.	App.	Gls.	Asst.	A yellow card	A red card
Maldives			League			FA Cup			President's Cup			Asia			Other			Total			A yellow card	A red card
Eydhafushi	Minivan Championship	2017	?	1	0	—			—			—			—			?	1	0	0	0
Eydhafushi	Total		?	1	0	—			—			—			—			?	1	0	0	0
Career total			?	1	0	0	0	0	0	0	0	0	0	0	0	0	0	?	1	0	0	0
