= Mujuthaaz Mohamed =

Maldivian footballer

Personal information
- Full name: Mujuthaaz Mohamed
- Date of birth: 25 October 1992 (age 34)
- Place of birth: Th. Thimarafushi, Maldives
- Position: Left back

Youth career
- Club Valencia

Senior career*
Years	Team	Apps	(Gls)
2014–2015	Club Valencia		
2015–2017	Club Eagles		
2017	→ Club Valencia (loan)		
2018–2021	Maziya		
2021	→ Super United (loan)		
2023–2024	New Radiant		

International career^{‡}
2014	Maldives U23	3	(0)
2018–	Maldives	4	(0)
- * Club domestic league appearances and goals ‡ National team caps and goals as of 9 September 2018

Mujuthaaz Mohamed (born 25 October 1992), known as Mujey is a Maldivian professional footballer who plays as a left back for New Radiant.

== Career ==
Mujuthaaz started his career at Club Valencia before joining Club Eagles in 2015.

Before moving to Maziya in 2018, Mujuthaaz was loaned out to Club Valencia with Ahmed Nashid and Sujan Perera for the 2017 Maldives FA Cup since Club Eagles failed to qualify for the 2017 Dhivehi Premier League, finishing 2017 Malé League at 5th on table. However, Club Valencia later withdrew their participation in the tournament.

== International ==
Mujuthaaz's first international experience was the 2014 Asian games where the Maldives under-23 side were eliminated from the group stage.

He had a handful of Maldives senior side call-ups on different occasions but failed to make it through to the final squad. On 23 March 2018, he played his first senior international game in a friendly against Singapore during Maldives' training camp in Singapore to prepare for the 2018 SAFF Championship.

On 27 March 2018, Mujuthaaz played his first competitive game for Maldives, in the 7–0 home win over Bhutan in the last group stage match of 2018 FIFA World Cup qualification second round.

He received his call-up for the final 2018 SAFF Championship squad and played in both group stage matches against Sri Lanka and India. Maldives went on to win the SAFF Championship for the second time that year.

== Honours ==
Club Eagles

- President's Cup: 2016

Maziya

- Dhivehi Premier League: 2019–20

Maldives

- SAFF Championship: 2018
