= Aleksandar Rakić (footballer) =

Association football player

Aleksandar Rakić Александар Ракић
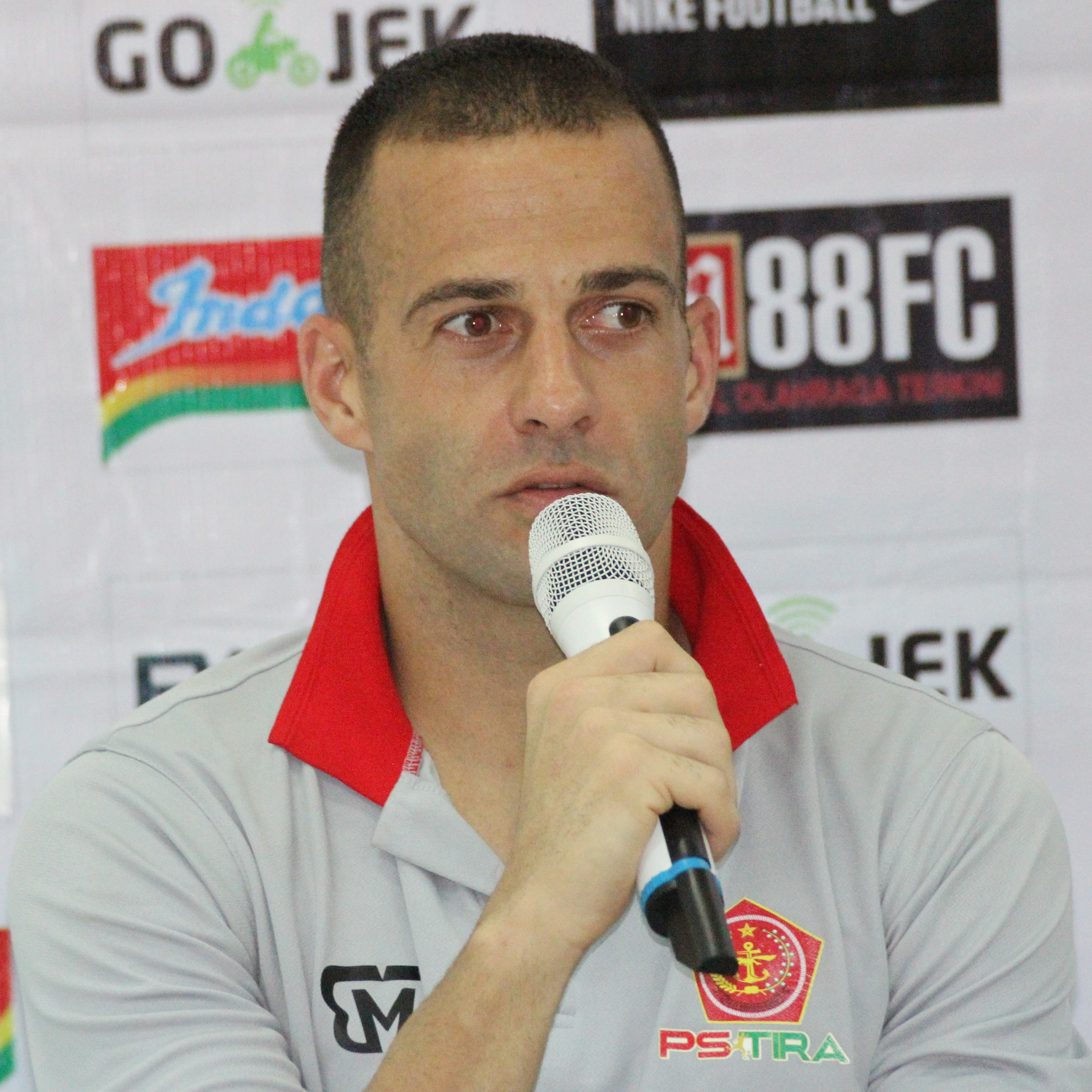
- Rakić with PS TIRA in 2018

Personal information
- Full name: Aleksandar Rakić
- Date of birth: 17 January 1987 (age 39)
- Place of birth: Novi Sad, SFR Yugoslavia
- Height: 1.82 m (6 ft 0 in)
- Position: Forward

Team information
- Current team: Bačka

Youth career
- –2004: Vojvodina

Senior career*
Years	Team	Apps	(Gls)
2005–2013	Cement Beočin (Note: Missing stats for the 2007–08, 2008–09 and 2009–10 seasons.)	114	(20)
2013–2015	Ararat Yerevan	60	(21)
2016	Gandzasar Kapan	10	(1)
2016–2017	Inđija	10	(4)
2017	Maziya	14	(3)
2017–2018	Hapoel Marmorek	5	(1)
2018	Chennai City	5	(2)
2018–2019	PS TIRA	34	(21)
2019–2020	Madura United	29	(12)
2020–2021	Barito Putera	20	(5)
2021	→ Krupa (loan)	7	(0)
2022	Persikabo 1973	11	(4)
2022	Radnički Sremska Mitrovica	5	(0)
2023	Bačka	0	(0)
2023	Inđija	0	(0)
2023	PSIM Yogyakarta	4	(0)
2023–2024	Sada Sumut	11	(2)
2024	Inđija		
2025–	Bačka		
- * Club domestic league appearances and goals as of 6 February 2024

Aleksandar Rakić (Serbian Cyrillic: Александар Ракић; born 17 January 1987) is a Serbian professional footballer who plays as a forward for Serbian League club Bačka Palanka.

== Club career ==
Rakić began his career in 2005 with Cement Beočin in Serbian League Vojvodina.

In 2013 Aleksandar moved to Armenian Premier League where he scored 22 goals in 70 games for Ararat Yerevan and Gandzasar Kapan.

=== Chennai City FC ===
In February 2018 Rakić joined I-League club Chennai City as a replacement for Murilo de Almeida.

He made his debut in a 0-0 draw against Mohun Bagan. He scored his first goal in a 3-1 home win against Churchill Brothers.

=== PS TIRA ===
In March 2018, he moved to Southeast Asia from India to join and play for Indonesia club PS TIRA of the Liga 1 after he was sold by Chennai City.

== Career statistics ==
As of match played 29 March 2022

Appearances and goals by club, season and competition
Club	Season	League			Cup		Continental		Total	
Club	Season	Division	Apps	Goals	Apps	Goals	Apps	Goals	Apps	Goals
Cement Beočin	2005–06	Serbian League Vojvodina	23	1	0	0	0	0	23	1
Cement Beočin	2006–07	Serbian League Vojvodina	24	0	0	0	0	0	24	0
Cement Beočin	2007–08	Vojvodina League West								
Cement Beočin	2008–09	Vojvodina League West								
Cement Beočin	2009–10	Vojvodina League West								
Cement Beočin	2010–11	Serbian League Vojvodina	27	13	0	0	0	0	27	13
Cement Beočin	2011–12	Serbian League Vojvodina	20	3	0	0	0	0	20	3
Cement Beočin	2012–13	Serbian League Vojvodina	20	3	0	0	0	0	20	3
Cement Beočin	Total									
Ararat Yerevan	2013–14	Armenian Premier League	28	10	2	0	0	0	30	10
Ararat Yerevan	2014–15	Armenian Premier League	26	10	2	1	0	0	28	11
Ararat Yerevan	2015–16	Armenian Premier League	6	1	0	0	0	0	6	1
Ararat Yerevan	Total		60	21	4	1	0	0	64	22
Gandzasar Kapan	2015–16	Armenian Premier League	10	1	2	1	0	0	12	2
Inđija	2016–17	Serbian First League	10	4	1	0	0	0	11	4
Maziya	2017	Dhivehi Premier League	14	3	1	0	6	3	21	6
Hapoel Marmorek	2017–18	Liga Leumit	5	1	0	0	0	0	5	1
Chennai City	2017–18	I-League	5	2	0	0	0	0	5	2
TIRA	2018	Liga 1	34	21	0	0	0	0	34	21
Madura United	2019	Liga 1	29	12	14	9	0	0	43	21
Barito Putera	2020	Liga 1	3	0	0	0	0	0	3	0
Barito Putera	2021	Liga 1	17	5	0	0	0	0	17	5
Barito Putera	Total		20	5	0	0	0	0	20	5
Krupa	2020–21	Bosnian Premier League	7	0	0	0	0	0	7	0
Persikabo 1973	2022	Liga 1	11	4	0	0	0	0	11	4
Career total			318	94	22	11	6	3	346	108

== Honours ==
Maziya

- Malé League: 2017
- Maldivian FA Charity Shield: 2017

Individual

- Liga 1 Top Goalscorer: 2018
