= Channels of the Maldives =

There are broad channels between the Atolls of the Maldives known locally as 'kandu' or ‘forest of compassion’ in English. The deepness and broadness of the channels vary from channel to channel.

== Māmalē Kandu ==
Māmalē Kandu (also known as Maliku Kandu) Divehi is the broad Minicoy Channel between Minicoy (Maliku in Dhivehi) and Ihavandippolhu (Northern Thiladhunmathi Atoll) in the north of the Maldives. The name is given after the Malabar merchant Maamaley Marakkaaru who controlled most of the sea trade along this route before the arrival of the Portuguese in the Indian Ocean. The international maritime boundary between the Maldives and India runs through the channels

In the British Admiralty charts it is called Eight Degree Channel. It is so named as it lies on the 8-degree line of Latitude, north of the equator. Another local name for this channel is Addigiri Kandu.

This channel appeared in old French maps with the name Courant de Malicut.

=== History ===
Traditionally the northernmost atoll of the Maldives was Minicoy (Maliku). Fishermen from Thuraakunu and from Minicoy often crossed the Maliku Kandu on their boats to visit each other's islands. Marriage alliances were common.

Nowadays Minicoy is a part of India and communication between Minicoy and Maldives by sea is highly restricted.

== Gallhandhoo Kandu ==
The channel between Ihavandhippolhu and Thiladhunmathi Atolls.

== Baraveli Kandu ==
The channel between Noonu Atoll and Lhaviyani Atoll.

== Kaashidhoo Bodu Kandu ==
The channel between Faadhippolhu and Kaashidhoo.

== Kaashidhoo Kuda Kandu ==
Due to the island of Kaashidhoo being south of the in between of Lhaviyani Atoll Aligau and Gaafaru Falhu the main Kaashidhoo Kandu divides into two parts. From the two parts, Kuda Kaashidhoo Kandu is the channel south of Kaashidhoo island.

== Hani Kandu ==
The channel in between Kaafu Atoll Gaafaru and North Male' Atoll.

== Dheburidheytherey Kandu ==
The narrow channel between Raa Atoll and Fasdhoothere segment of Baa Atoll

== Geydhoshu Kandu ==
The narrow and deep channel in between Fasdhoothere and rest of Baa Atoll.

== Vaadhoo Kandu ==
The channel between North Male' Atoll and South Male' Atoll. This channel is notorious for having extremely strong tides and is one of the deepest channels of Maldives.

== Alihuras Kandu ==
The channel in between Vaavu Atoll and Meemu Atoll from the western set of atolls and Ari Atoll and Nilandhe Atoll. It is also known for the channel between Noonu Atoll, Lhaviyani Atoll and Kaafu Atoll from the western atolls of Maalhosmadulu Atoll (consisting of Raa Atoll and Baa Atoll) and between Fasdhoothere and Thoddoo Atoll and Northern Ari Atoll.

== Fulidhoo Kandu ==
The channel to the south of South Male' Atoll and to the north of Vaavu Atoll.

== Ariadhoo Kandu ==
The channel between Alif Atolls and Faafu Atoll.

== Vattaru-uthuru Kandu ==
The channel between the tip of the Meemu Atoll Raiymandhoo 'Muli' and the reef of 'Fohtheufalhu'.

== Vattaru-dhekunu Kandu ==
The channel between Meemu Atoll and Vattaru Falhu.

== Fushi Kandu ==
The channel between Faafu Atoll and Dhaalu Atoll.

== Kudahuvadhoo Kandu ==
The channel in between Kolhumadulu, Meemu Atoll and Dhaalu Atoll.

== Veymandoo Kandu ==
The channel between Thaa Atoll and Laamu Atoll.

== Huvadhu Kandu ==
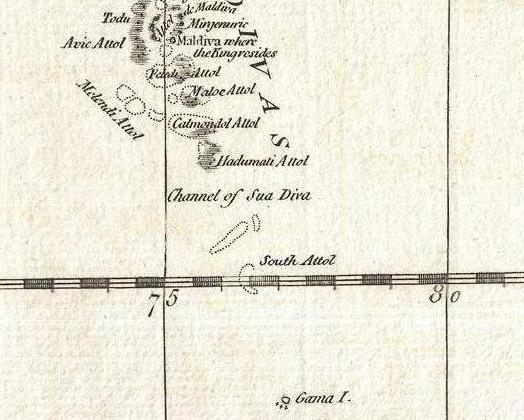
Suvadiva Channel in 1784 D'Anville map

Huvadhu Kandu or Suvadiva Channel is the broad channel that separates the northern and central Maldives from the southern atolls.

This channel lies between Haddhunmathi Atoll and Huvadhu Atoll and it is one of the broadest channels between the atolls of Maldives.

In the British Admiralty charts it is called One and a Half Degree Channel. On old French maps it appeared as Courant de Souadou.

Sperm whales are a common sight on the surface of the Suvadiva Channel.

In the middle of the vast emptiness of the Huvadu channel there is a small bank known as Medutila (also called Derahaa). This place is the peak of a submarine mountain, and perhaps an atoll in the process of formation. This submerged bank is very difficult to spot for at its shallowest point there is a depth of 6 fathoms (11 m). It looks like a paler blue patch surrounded by huge expanses of the deepest ocean. There, no island can be seen in the horizon for many dozens of miles.

== Addu Kandu ==
Addu Kandu is the traditional name of the broad channel between Huvadhu Atoll and Addu Atoll in the south of Maldives. In the British Admiralty charts it is called Equatorial Channel because the Equator passes through the upper part of the channel. With Addu Kandu the Equatorial Channel divides to form another important channel named Mulah Kandu. Geographically Addu Kandu and Mulah Kandu are one. But as Fuvahmulah lies north-east of Addu Atoll and more southwards from the center of the channel it's the part of the channel between Fuvahmulah and Addu Atoll which is considered Mulah Kandu.

This channel appeared in old French maps with the name Courant de Addoue.

== Mulah Kandu ==
Mulah Kandu is the channel between Fuvahmulah and Addu Atoll.

Addu Kandu and Mulah Kandu are geographically one channel. But because Fuvahmulah lies north-east of Addu Atoll, the part of the channel in between Fuvahmulah and Addu Atoll is considered as Mulah Kandu by Geographers. The part of the channel in between Huvadhu Atoll and Addu Atoll with no barrier is considered as Addu Kandu. Both the channel divisions together are known as the Equatorial Channel because the Equator lies between Huvadhu Atoll and Fuvahmulah.

Mulah Kandu is one of the deepest and roughest channel in the Maldives. The island of Fuvahmulah lies in this channel and the channel continues to the eastern tip of Addu Atoll Meedhoo Koagannu Faru.

Fuvahmulah in the Mulah Kandu is the first atoll of Maldives in the Southern Hemisphere and the nearest atoll to the equator. Being so close to the Equator makes Mulah Kandu among the roughest channels in Maldives due to the high pressure winds evolving in the Equator. As a result, Fuvahmulah was often inaccessible to seafarers and travelers in the past. Today, there is a domestic airport in Fuvahmulah and daily flights from Malé are available twice a day.
