= 2017 Maldives FA Cup final =

- Event: 2017 Maldives FA Cup
TC Sports	New Radiant
2	2
- New Radiant won 4–2 on penalties
- Date: 6 December 2017
- Venue: National Football Stadium, Malé
- Referee: Xaypaseuth Phongsanit (Laos)
- Attendance: 1,800

The 2017 Maldives FA Cup final is the 29th Final of the Maldives FA Cup.

== Route to the final ==
=== TC Sports ===
Round	Team 1	Score	Team 2	Ref
SF	TC Sports	2–0	Maziya	

=== New Radiant ===
Round	Team 1	Score	Team 2	Ref
QF	New Radiant	5–1	Eagles	
SF	New Radiant	4–0	Green Streets	

== Match ==
=== Details ===
6 December 2017
21:00

TC Sports	2–2 (a.e.t.)	New Radiant
Stewart 6', 26' (pen.)	Report	50' Fazeel; 75' (pen.) Fasir
Penalties
El-Maghrabi (penalty scored); Stewart (penalty missed); Halil (penalty scored); Suhail (penalty missed)	2–4	(penalty scored) Fazeel; (penalty scored) Fasir; (penalty missed) El-Dor; (penalty scored) Akram; (penalty scored) Mohamed

National Football Stadium, Malé
Attendance: 1,800
Referee: Xaypaseuth Phongsanit (Laos)

TC Sports	New Radiant

GK	13	(Nepal) Kiran Chemjong
RB	24	(Maldives) Ahmed Rilwan	(yellow card) 38'
CB	2	(Egypt) Easa El-Maghrabi
CB	4	(Maldives) Abdulla Haneef (c)	(yellow card) 70'
LB	16	(Maldives) Ahmed Farrah	(yellow card) 15'
DM	21	(Maldives) Mohamed Azzam	(yellow card) 96'
CM	17	(Maldives) Ibrahim Waheed Hassan		(substituted off) 49'
RM	8	(Egypt) Halil El-Bezawy	(yellow card) 85'
AM	19	(Maldives) Naiz Hassan
LM	9	(Saint Vincent and the Grenadines) Cornelius Stewart	(yellow card) 6'
CF	7	(Maldives) Ibrahim Mahudhee	(yellow card) 110'	(substituted off) 120'
Substitutes:
GK	1	(Maldives) Ibrahim Nadheem Adam		(substituted in) 49'
DF	6	(Maldives) Muruthala Adnan		(substituted in) 77'
FW	11	(Maldives) Nashaah Ahmed		(substituted in) 77'
DF	12	(Maldives) Mohamed Samir		(substituted in) 77'
FW	14	(Maldives) Ali Nafiu		(substituted in) 77'
FW	23	(Maldives) Ahmed Suhail		(substituted in) 120'
DF	26	(Maldives) Mohamed Ajufaan		(substituted in) 77'
MF	30	(Maldives) Akmal Mohamed		(substituted in) 77'
MF	40	(Maldives) Ali Nasooh Rasheed		(substituted in) 77'
Manager:
(Maldives) Mohamed Nizam

GK	25	(Maldives) Imran Mohamed (c)
RB	8	(Maldives) Rilwan Waheed		(substituted off) 59'
CB	5	(Lebanon) Hussein El-Dor
CB	13	(Maldives) Akram Abdul Ghanee	(yellow card) 58'
LB	4	(Maldives) Ahmed Abdulla	(yellow card) 45+1'	(substituted off) 50'
DM	6	(Spain) Candela
CM	10	(Maldives) Hamza Mohamed
RM	16	(Maldives) Abdulla Midhuhath Fahmy
LM	7	(Maldives) Ali Fasir
AM	36	(Maldives) Ibrahim Fazeel
CF	12	(Maldives) Ali Ashfaq	(yellow card) 100'
Substitutes:
DF	14	(Maldives) Ahmed Nuhaadh
DF	19	(Maldives) Mohamed Rasheed		(substituted in) 50'
DF	20	(Maldives) Farooq Ismail
FW	21	(Maldives) Hassan Adhuham		(substituted off) 59'
GK	22	(Maldives) Mohamed Faisal
GK	24	(Maldives) Abdulla Ziyazan
MF	27	(Maldives) Ali Shaamiu
MF	28	(Maldives) Solah
MF	37	(Maldives) Mohamed Sadin Abdul Hannan
Manager:
(Spain) Óscar Bruzón

Assistant referees:
Kilar Ladsavong (Laos)
Somphavanh Louanglath (Laos)
Fourth official:
Khamsing Xaiyavongsy (Laos)

Match rules

- 90 minutes.
- 30 minutes of extra-time if necessary.
- Penalty shoot-out if scores still level.
- Maximum of three substitutions.

== See also ==
- 2017 Maldives FA Cup
