= Kolhufushi =

Kolhufushi masy refer to the following places in the Maldives:

- Kolhufushi (Meemu Atoll)
- Kolhufushi, Noonu Atoll
- Kolhufushi, two islands of Thaa Atoll
