= Mohamed Imran =

Maldivian footballer

Personal information
- Full name: Mohamed Imran
- Date of birth: 25 May 1988 (age 38)
- Place of birth: Maldives
- Position: Goalkeeper

Senior career*
Years	Team	Apps	(Gls)
2009–2011	Club Valencia		
2012–2014	Maziya		
2015–2016	TC Sports		
2017–2018	Victory		
2017	→ Sh. Milandhoo (loan)		

International career
2012–2017	Maldives	17	(0)
- * Club domestic league appearances and goals

Mohamed Imran (born 25 May 1988) commonly known as Kuda Imma, is a Maldivian footballer who plays as a goalkeeper, currently for Sh. Milandhoo on loan from Victory.

== International career ==
Imran announced his retirement from international football on 12 October 2017.
