= Baa Atoll Education Centre =

Coordinates: 5.103964°N 73.070508°E

- ބ. އަތޮޅު ތަޢުލީމީ މަރުކަޒު
- Baa Atholhu Thau'leemee Markazu
- Eydhafushi, Baa Atoll; Maldives

Information
- School type: Primary, Secondary & Higher Secondary (Co-education)
- Motto: Do the Best – Be the Best
- Founded: February 24, 1978
- Session: 6:40 AM - 1:10 PM
- Principal: Ahmed Rafeeu
- Grades: LKG, UKG, 1 - 12
- Houses: 4
- Colour: Capri Green
- Website: baec.edu.mv

Baa Atoll Education Centre (Dhivehi : ބ. އަތޮޅު ތަޢުލީމީ މަރުކަޒު ), the first Maldivian government school established outside of Malé, was inaugurated on February 24, 1978, by the then Minister of Education Abdul Sattar Moosa Didi. In 1976, the foundation was laid in collaboration with UNICEF. It first began with 58 students and 3 teachers, it now has 1137 students and a staff of 106. Baa Atoll Education Centre provides primary, secondary and higher secondary education.
