= List of lighthouses in the Maldives =

This is a list of lighthouses in the Maldives.

== Lighthouses ==
Name	Image	Year built	Location & coordinates	Class of light	Focal height	NGA number	Admiralty number	Range nml
Feeali Lighthouse		n/a	Feeali; 3°16′07.9″N 73°00′06.0″E	Fl W 6s.	5 metres (16 ft)	27428	F0765.8	7
Foteo Lighthouse		n/a	Vaavu Atoll; 3°27′28.1″N 73°45′28.9″E	Fl (2) W 10s.	15 metres (49 ft)	27424	F0765.65	10
Isdhoo Lighthouse		n/a	Isdhoo; 2°07′52.9″N 73°35′03.0″E	Fl (2) W 10s.	15 metres (49 ft)	27464	F0767.05	10
Kanifushi Lighthouse		n/a	Kanifushi; 5°21′57.2″N 73°19′56.2″E	Fl (2) W 10s.	15 metres (49 ft)	27384	F0764.6	10
Kolhufushi Lighthouse		n/a	Kolhufushi; 2°46′27.9″N 73°25′21.5″E	Fl (2) W 10s.	15 metres (49 ft)	27444	F0766.65	10
Kudahuvadhoo Lighthouse		n/a	Kudahuvadhoo; 2°40′17.8″N 72°53′49.6″E	Fl (2) W 10s.	15 metres (49 ft)	27448	F0766.4	10
Maalhos Lighthouse		n/a	Maalhos; 3°59′14.0″N 72°43′14.9″E	Fl (2) W 10s.	15 metres (49 ft)	27415	F0765.4	10
Malé Entrances Lighthouses		n/a	Malé; 4°10′45.6″N 73°30′45.9″E	Fl R or Fl G mark both side of the 4 entrances	4 metres (13 ft)	27412	F0765	n/a
Nilandhoo Lighthouse		n/a	Nilandhoo; 3°03′29.9″N 72°53′30.7″E	Fl (2) W 20s.	15 metres (49 ft)	27432	F0766	10
Raimmandhoo Lighthouse		n/a	Raimmandhoo; 3°05′25.4″N 73°38′29.6″E	Fl W 10s.	15 metres (49 ft)	27436	F0766.6	10
Thuraakunu Lighthouse		n/a	Thuraakunu; 7°06′19.4″N 72°53′42.7″E	Fl W 5s.	15 metres (49 ft)	27394	F0762.9	10

== See also ==
- Lists of lighthouses and lightvessels
