= Abdul Wahid Hussain =

Maldivian footballer

Personal information
- Full name: Abdul Wahid Hussain
- Date of birth: 6 April 1966 (age 60)
- Place of birth: B. Eydhafushi, Maldives
- Position: Defender

Senior career*
Years	Team	Apps	(Gls)
1984–1992	Eydhafushi Z.J		
1993–1996	Club Lagoons		

International career
1991	Maldives	3	(0)
Medal record
Men's football
Representing Maldives
South Asian Games
Silver medal – second place	1991 Colombo	Team competition
- * Club domestic league appearances and goals

Abdul Wahid Hussain (Dhivehi: ޢަބްދުލް ވާޙިދު ޙުސެއިން; born 6 April 1966) is a former Maldivian international footballer who played as a defender.

He was the first player from Eydhafushi to represent the Maldives national team at a major international football tournament and is considered a pioneer in the inclusion of atoll-based players in national football. He was part of the historic Maldives squad that won a silver medal at the 1991 South Asian Games in Colombo.

== Career ==
Wahid began his football career with the Eydhafushi Z.J, a team that rose to prominence in the Maldivian second division in the 1980s. After narrowly missing out on the championship in 1984, Eydhafushi Z.J won the second division title in 1985 with a 1-0 victory over Juventus.

Wahid also played for Club Lagoons during his career, before retiring from competitive football in 1996.

== International ==
Hungarian coach Miklós Temesvári included Wahid in his plans for the 1991 South Asian Games football event, making him the first player to get called up for national team from outside capital Malé. Wahid's selection was a milestone. He not only made the squad but was named in the starting eleven throughout the tournament.

The Maldives reached the final, facing Pakistan, and held them goalless until the 82nd minute. Although they ultimately lost 2–0, the silver medal was a significant achievement.

== Honours ==
Eydhafushi

- Second Division: 1985; Runner-up 1984

Maldives

- South Asian Games

Silver: 1991
