= Raimmandhoo =

Raimmandhoo ރަތްމަންދޫ
- Inhabited island
- Location in Maldives
- Coordinates: 03°05′20″N 73°38′20″E
- Country: Maldives
- Administrative atoll: Meemu Atoll
- Distance to Malé: 121 km (75 mi)

Dimensions
  - Length: 0.850 km (0.528 mi)
  - Width: 0.550 km (0.342 mi)

Population (2022)
  - Total: 171
- Time zone: UTC+05:00 (MST)
- Raimmandhoo Lighthouse
- Foundation: concrete base
- Construction: metal skeletal tower
- Height: 13 m (43 ft)
- Shape: square pyramidal skeletal tower
- Markings: grey tower with rectangular black daymark
- Power source: solar power
- Focal height: 15 m (49 ft)
- Range: 10 nmi (19 km; 12 mi)
- Characteristic: Fl W 10s

Raimmandhoo (Dhivehi: ރަތްމަންދޫ) or Raiymandhoo is one of the inhabited islands of Meemu Atoll.

== Geography ==
The island is 121 km (75 mi; 65 nmi) south of the country's capital, Malé. The land area of the island is 28.1 ha (69 acres) in 2018. The island was described as having an area of 21.6 ha (53 acres) in 2004 and 2007.

=== Ecology ===
Parrotfishes, snappers, surgeonfishes and wrasses are common in the waters around the island.

== Demography ==
Historical population
Year	Pop.	±%
2006	156	—
2014	112	−28.2%
2022	171	+52.7%
2006-2022: Census populations Source:

== Utilities ==
The power supply on Raiymandhoo is provided by a combination of solar, wind and diesel power.

== Healthcare ==
Raiymandhoo has a pharmacy.

== See also ==
- List of lighthouses in the Maldives
