= 2017 Minivan Championship =

Minivan Championship
- Season: 2017

The 2017 Minivan Championship Football Tournament is the third season under its current tournament format. The tournament began on March 15.

== Structure ==
Minivan Championship will be played for two stages.

Zone stage

- Zone 1—8 includes clubs from all atolls of the Maldives.
- Each zone consists of different Atolls.
- Atolls will play separate competitions.
- All atoll champions from each zone will play separate competitions.
- Champion teams of all zones qualify for final stage.

Final stage

- 4 teams qualified for this stage divided into two even groups.
- Teams play against each other once.
- Top two teams of each group advance into semi-finals.
- Four semi-finalists qualify to this year's Dhivehi Premier League.

== Teams ==
A total of 75 teams entered the competition this year.

== Final stage ==
=== Group stage ===
==== Group A ====
| Pos | Team | Pld | W | D | L | GF | GA | GD | Pts | Qualification or relegation |
|---|---|---|---|---|---|---|---|---|---|---|
| 1 | Sh. Milandhoo | 3 | 1 | 1 | 1 | 6 | 5 | +1 | 4 | Qualification to 2017 Dhivehi Premier League |
| 2 | A. A. Maalhos | 3 | 1 | 1 | 1 | 3 | 3 | 0 | 4 | Qualification to 2017 Dhivehi Premier League |
| 3 | B. Eydhafushi | 3 | 1 | 1 | 1 | 4 | 6 | −2 | 4 | |
| 4 | H. Dh. Kulhudhuffushi | 3 | 0 | 3 | 0 | 2 | 2 | 0 | 3 | |

6 July 2017
1550

| H. Dh. Kulhudhuffushi | 0–0 | B. Eydhafushi |
|---|---|---|
| | Report |

H. Dh. Kulhudhuffushi Football Stadium
7 July 2017
1550

| Sh. Milandhoo | 0–2 | A. A. Maalhos |
|---|---|---|
| | Report | 17' Ahmed Latheef; 68' Ahmed Amjad |

H. Dh. Kulhudhuffushi Football Stadium
9 July 2017
1550

| H. Dh. Kulhudhuffushi | 0–0 | A. A. Maalhos |
|---|---|---|
| | Report |

H. Dh. Kulhudhuffushi Football Stadium
10 July 2017
1550

| Sh. Milandhoo | 4–1 | B. Eydhafushi |
|---|---|---|
| Ibrahim Saeed 2'; Ismail Fathuhy ??'; Asraar Abdulla ??'; Hussain VIsaal ??' | Report; Report | 10' Mohamed Fasir |

H. Dh. Kulhudhuffushi Football Stadium
12 July 2017
1550

| B. Eydhafushi | 3–2 | A. A. Maalhos |
|---|---|---|
| Hussain Shifau ??'; Hussain Eeman ??'; Azmeen Abdul Sattar 55' | Report | 69' NA; 90+2' NA |

H. Dh. Kulhudhuffushi Football Stadium
13 July 2017
1550

| H. Dh. Kulhudhuffushi | 2–2 | Sh. Milandhoo |
|---|---|---|
| Ibrahim Hassan 57'; Hussain Abdul Rasheed 88' | Report | 76' Hussain Visaal; 86' Ali Junaid |

H. Dh. Kulhudhuffushi Football Stadium

==== Group B ====
| Pos | Team | Pld | W | D | L | GF | GA | GD | Pts | Qualification or relegation |
|---|---|---|---|---|---|---|---|---|---|---|
| 1 | Dh. Kudahuvadhoo | 3 | 2 | 1 | 0 | 4 | 2 | +2 | 7 | Qualification to 2017 Dhivehi Premier League |
| 2 | G. Dh. Thinadhoo | 3 | 1 | 2 | 0 | 5 | 3 | +2 | 5 | Qualification to 2017 Dhivehi Premier League |
| 3 | Th. Thimarafushi | 3 | 0 | 2 | 1 | 3 | 4 | −1 | 2 | |
| 4 | S. Feydhoo | 3 | 0 | 1 | 2 | 2 | 5 | −3 | 1 | |

6 July 2017
1550

| G. Dh. Thinadhoo | 0–0 | Dh. Kudahuvadhoo |

G. Dh. Thinadhoo Football Stadium
7 July 2017
1550

| Th. Thimarafushi | 0–0 | S. Feydhoo |
|---|---|---|
| | Report |

G. Dh. Thinadhoo Football Stadium
9 July 2017
1550

| G. Dh. Thinadhoo | 3–1 | S. Feydhoo |
|---|---|---|
| Hussain Abdul Hakeem 65'; Ibrahim Shafrad 69', ??' | Report | 30' Ahmed Tholal |

G. Dh. Thinadhoo Football Stadium
10 July 2017
1550

| Th. Thimarafushi | 1–2 | Dh. Kudahuvadhoo |
|---|---|---|
| Abdulla Nabith ??' | Report | ??' Adam Shaheem ??' Mohamed Ishan |

G. Dh. Thinadhoo Football Stadium
12 July 2017
1550

| Dh. Kudahuvadhoo | 2–1 | S. Feydhoo |
|---|---|---|
| Cristian 23'; Irufan Adam ??' | Report | ??' Vincent |

G. Dh. Thinadhoo Football Stadium
13 July 2017
1550

| G. Dh. Thinadhoo | 2–2 | Th. Thimarafushi |
|---|---|---|
| Ahmed Bilal 10'; Pecharroman Izaguirre Alain 43' | Report | 66' Ahmed Hailam; 90+2' Misbah Ibrahim |

G. Dh. Thinadhoo Football Stadium

=== Semi-finals ===
18 July 2017
1550

| Sh. Milandhoo | 0–3 | G. Dh. Thinadhoo |
|---|---|---|
| | Report | 19' Pecharroman Izaguirre Alain; 43', 90+3' Ortega Lizzano |

G. Dh. Thinadhoo Football Stadium
18 July 2017
1550

| Dh. Kudahuvadhoo | 4–1 | A. A. Maalhos |
|---|---|---|
| Adam Shaheem 13'; Cristian 57'; Mohamed Ismail 67'; Afonja Jibola 78' | Report | 68' Adam Majid |

H. Dh. Kulhudhuffushi Football Stadium

=== Final ===
21 July 2017
2100

| G. Dh. Thinadhoo | 0–2 | Dh. Kudahuvadhoo |
|---|---|---|
| | Report | 19' Irufan Adam Naseer; 79' Afonja Jibola |

National Football Stadium, Malé
