= Nilandhoo (Faafu Atoll) =

Nilandhoo ނިލަންދޫ
- Inhabited island
- Location in Maldives
- Coordinates: 03°03′20″N 72°53′28″E
- Country: Maldives
- Administrative atoll: Faafu Atoll
- Distance to Malé: 141.57 km (87.97 mi)

Dimensions
  - Length: 1.175 km (0.730 mi)
  - Width: 0.725 km (0.450 mi)

Population (2022)
  - Total: 1,823
- Time zone: UTC+05:00 (MST)
- Nilandhoo Lighthouse
- Construction: metal (tower), concrete (foundation)
- Height: 13 m (43 ft)
- Shape: square pyramidal skeletal tower
- Markings: Grey (tower), Rectangle (black, daymark)
- Power source: solar power
- Focal height: 15 m (49 ft)
- Range: 10 nmi (19 km; 12 mi)
- Characteristic: Fl(2) W 20s

Nilandhoo (Dhivehi: ނިލަންދޫ) is the capital of Faafu Atoll, which has five inhabited islands and is an administrative division of the Maldives. It is the largest and most populated island in the region, and includes historical sites such as foah'mathi and Aasaari Miskiy and a school. Foah'mathi is a historical site with a Buddhist temple under it, while Aasaari Miskiy is the second mosque built in the Maldives.

== Archaeology ==
Buddhist remains, including a stupa, are found on the island. A team of Norwegian archaeologists conducted an excavation during Thor Heyerdahl's visit.

== Geography ==
The island is 141.57 km (88 mi; 76 nmi) southwest of the country's capital, Malé. Nilandhoo is the largest island in Faafu Atoll and lies in the southern rim of the region. The island is densely populated with easy harbors. The island is coded as L-6.

== Demographics ==
Historical population
Year	Pop.	±%
2006	1,303	—
2014	1,553	+19.2%
2022	1,823	+17.4%
2006-2022: Census populations Source:

== Economy ==
Fishing is the main source of economy on Nilandhoo. The island has 26 mechanised vessels, 8 bokkura used for fishing, 1 yacht Dhoni and 2 sathari dhoni used to travel between island and Male. Other than fishing, residents of the island engage in agriculture, construction, education, government jobs and resort constructions.

== Health Service ==
Basic health service is available at Nilandhoo since 1996, when its health center opened. After the government moved the capital of Atoll from Magoodhooo to Nilandhoo, the health center's name changed to F. Atoll Health Center. The island also has two private pharmacies with two qualified pharmacists, named Medicine Zone-4 and Life Pharma.

== Education ==
Education from primary level up to grade 12 are available at the education center. Preschool education is available at "Quran aai Behey Marukau" since its opening in 2006. The Faaf Atoll Education Center (F.A.E.C) was opened in February 1986 by the Minister of Education, Mohamed Zahir Hussain. The center provided secondary education since 1996, and the first group of seven students to complete secondary education in the school took the GCE O-Level Exam in 1998. The school has four buildings and includes a computer lab, a science lab and a library.

Head Master House

Head Master house opened in February 1986. it is used as residence who come to serve as headmaster for F. Atoll Education Center. It is located near F. Atoll Education Center in front of a football playground. Both satellite TV and internet service, are available currently at headmaster house.

Abdulla Ismail's Memorial library

Abdulla Ismail's library was first opened in F. Magoodhoo and moved to Nilandhoo in February 1999. It was built as a memory of Maldivian mathematician Abdulla Ismail, who was born in Faafu Atoll Himithi. The library contains many books in a variety of subjects. It is located in front of Faafu Atoll Education Center next to Faafu Atoll health center near Thahaaluf mosque

== Other Buildings ==
Faaf Atoll Store

A supermarket, located in Kurimagu Square next to pre-school and near Nilandhoo office. The store is run by an Atoll development committee and the Atoll office. it sells all sorts of goods, beginning from matchboxes to wood and cement, etc. People from neighboring islands come to Nilandhoo to buy goods they need for their daily life. Atoll Dhoni travels twice a week between Male' and Nilandhoo to carry goods needed for the Atoll store.

Faaf Atoll police Station

Nilandhe Atholhu Uthuruburi Police Station was established on 21 April 2003 in F. Nilandhoo. The main objective of Nilandhe Atholhu Uthuruburi Police Station is to maintain peace, stability and harmony across the atoll and carry out investigations into crimes and public complaints in a fair and friendly manner to deliver justice to the locals of the atoll. Nilandhe Atholhu Uthuruburi Police Station will also assist the citizens, the atoll and island chiefs to reduce crime and maintain a low crime rate.

Faaf Nilandhoo Preschool

Nilandhoo pre-school is run by women's committee. It provides education for the pre-school level. The service is provided by four certified pre-school teachers with help of F.A.E.C head student's association. It is located in south west side of island (main road/Ameeneemagu) in front of Nilandhoo office, west to Faaf Atoll store.

Faaf Nilandhoo Power House

This is a public power house run by Nilandhoo island development committee. They use four separate engines to provide 24-hour electricity to the Nilandhoo community. It is located in northwest district of Nilandhoo in front of Veyodhoshu Square near Faaf Atoll Office.

Faaf Nilandhoo Oil House

Thi is an oil house run by the Nilandhoo island development committee. It is located in front of a jetty near the western harbour in the northwest corner of the island. It provides a fueling service for both local and foreign sea vehicles.

Faaf Nilandhoo- Thahaaluf Mosque

This is the largest mosque in the island. It was built in an old graveyard. At that time in front of graveyard there was a small mosque called Bulha miskih. It is located behind Abdulla ismail's library near the health center and pharmacies.

Faaf Nilandhoo- Salaam Mosque

The mosque is built by members of Day light club. Before there was a small mosque called Dhon kabo miskih in this area. it is located in northeast corner of island near the garbage collecting area close to beach.

Faaf Nilandhoo- Wahdha Mosque

This is first modern mosque built in Nilandhoo. Before there was a mosque called Fanna miskih in this area. It is located in the northwest side of the island next to Nilandhoo office and near the oil house (before 2007) and Veyodhoshu Square.

Faaf Nilandhoo- Aasaary Mosque

The Aasaari Miskiiy, on the island of Nilandhoo in Faafu Atoll, is the second oldest mosque in the country, built during the reign of the first sultan, Mohamed Ul-Adil (1141-1166 d.c.). Some say the mosque is 800 years old and built by Sultan Mohamed Ibn Abdhulla, who was responsible for converting the country to Islam. This ancient mosque has an amazing structure of well-cut stones and its interior is decorated with patterned wooden scrollwork. It is possible that stones were recycled from the ruins of earlier pre-Islamic temples. Thor Heyerdahl's book ‘The Maldives Mystery’ devotes an entire chapter to this island. His expedition unearthed a number of phallic stone carvings, similar to the lingam associated with the Hindu god Shiva in his manifestation as the creator. Examples of these images can be seen in the National Museum in Malè. Heyerdahl's expedition also found ruins believed to have been part of an ancient gate, one of the seven surrounding a great pagan temple complex. Of Nilandhoo, Heyerdahl wrote: "Five teams of archeologists could dig here for five years and still make new discoveries… the magnitude of this prehistoric center seemed quite out proportion to the size of the island". The local authorities recently delimited the area around the mosque. Another major attraction of this island is an extensive Hindu temple complex discovered by the Norwegian anthropologist Thor Heyerdahl. The complex features several phallic statues and elaborate friezes of pre-Islamic Buddhist temples. A small hill (havitta) rises where some ruins of the pagan temple are supposed to be still undiscovered.

Local agricultural products

- Dried fish
- Salted fish
- Rihaakuru
- Dhiyaa hakuru
- Thatch
- Watermelon
- Cucumber
- Pumpkin and squash
- Chile and curry leaves
- Kale and Kang kong
- Banana
- Curry leaves
- Guava
- Mango

== See also ==
- List of lighthouses in the Maldives
