= 2017 President's Cup (Maldives) =

President's Cup
Tournament details
- Country: Maldives
- City: 1
- Venue: 1
- Dates: 9 – 15 December 2017
- Teams: 4

Final positions
- Champions: New Radiant (12th title)
- Runners-up: TC Sports

Tournament statistics
- Matches played: 4
- Goals scored: 12 (3 per match)
- Top goal scorer(s): Ibrahim Fazeel (2 goals)

The 2017 President's Cup is the 67th season of the President's Cup. Club Eagles are the defending champions, having beaten TC Sports Club in last season's final, winning their first President's Cup gold.

== Broadcasting rights ==
The broadcasting rights for all the matches of 2017 Maldives President's Cup were given to the Public Service Media.

== Qualifier ==
Top 4 teams after the end of 2017 Dhivehi Premier League will be qualified for the President's Cup.

Pos	Team	Pld	W	D	L	GF	GA	GD	Pts	Qualification
1	New Radiant	14	13	0	1	44	9	+35	39	2017 President's Cup
2	TC Sports	14	10	2	2	31	14	+17	32	2017 President's Cup
3	Maziya	14	8	3	3	30	10	+20	27	2017 President's Cup
4	G. Dh. Thinadhoo	14	5	3	6	23	18	+5	18	2017 President's Cup
5	Green Streets	14	5	1	8	15	28	−13	16	
6	Sh. Milandhoo	14	3	5	6	18	26	−8	14	
7	A. A. Maalhos	14	2	3	9	18	40	−22	9	
8	Dh. Kudahuvadhoo	14	0	3	11	6	40	−34	3	

== Final qualifier ==
9 December 2017
16:00

New Radiant	1–1	TC Sports
Shaamiu 15'	Report	30' Mazin
Penalties
El-Maghrabi (penalty scored); Ibrahim (penalty missed); Mahudhee (penalty scored); Azzam (penalty missed)	2–4	(penalty scored) Ashfaq; (penalty scored) Fazeel; (penalty scored) Akram; (penalty scored) Fasir

National Football Stadium, Male'
Attendance: 550

== Semi-final qualifier ==
9 December 2017
21:00

Maziya	3–2	G. Dh. Thinadhoo
Ashad 45'; Shakhaau 85'; Yasfaadh 90+2'	Report	55' Zubair; 65' (pen.) Avila

National Football Stadium, Male'
Attendance: 350
Referee: Ahmed Ameez

== Semi-final ==
12 December 2017
21:00

TC Sports	2–0	Maziya
El-Maghrabi 12' (pen.); Halil 37'	Report

National Football Stadium, Male'
Attendance: 500

== Final ==
15 December 2017
21:00

New Radiant	3–0	TC Sports
Fasir 70' (pen.); Fazeel 87', 90+4'	Report

National Football Stadium, Male'
Attendance: 1,900

== Statistics ==
=== Scorers ===
Rank	Player	Club	Goals
1	(Maldives) Ibrahim Fazeel	New Radiant	2
2	(Maldives) Ali Shaamiu	New Radiant	1
2	(Maldives) Mohamed Mazin	TC Sports	1
2	(Maldives) Ashad Ali	Maziya	1
2	(Maldives) Ahmed Zubair	G. Dh. Thinadhoo	1
2	(Colombia) Jose Avila	G. Dh. Thinadhoo	1
2	(Maldives) Mohamed Shakhaau	Maziya	1
2	(Maldives) Yasfaadh Habeeb	Maziya	1
2	(Maldives) Easa El-Maghrabi	TC Sports	1
2	(Maldives) Halil El-Bezawy	TC Sports	1
2	(Maldives) Ali Fasir	New Radiant	1

=== Assists ===
Rank	Player	Club	Assists
1	(Maldives) Ali Fasir	Maziya	2
2	(Maldives) Yasfaadh Habeeb	Eagles	1
2	(Maldives) Ansar Ibrahim	Eagles	1
2	(Maldives) Mohamed Samir	TC Sports	1
2	(Maldives) Ali Shaamiu	New Radiant	1
