= 2015 Rakhine United F.C. season =

Rakhine United
2015 season
- Owner: (Myanmar) U Zaw Min Thein
- Manager: (Myanmar) U Win Tin
- Stadium: Wai Thar Li Stadium
- Myanmar National League: 10th
- Bogyoke Aung San Cup: Semi-final

Rakhine United FC (Burmese: ရခိုင်ယူနိုက်တက် ဘောလုံးအသင်း) is a professional football club based in Rakhine State that plays in the Myanmar National League. The Rakhine United Football Club changed its name to Rakhapura United in December 2010. The club's original home stadium was Waytharli Yinpyin (which can be found in Sittwe Township) which was later changed to Thuwanna YTC Stadium. Last season, Rakhapura United FC stood in 10th position. Rakhine United FC had the biggest win (7–2) in General Aung San Cup against Manaw Myay. Rakhine United FC has a Facebook page which can be found here.

== Sponsorship ==
| Period | Sportswear | Sponsor |
|---|---|---|
| 2015 | (Thailand) Kool | (Myanmar) Up Energy drink |

== Club ==
=== Coaching staff ===
| Position | Staff |
|---|---|
| Manager | (Myanmar) U Win Tin |
| Assistant Manager | (Myanmar) U Maung Maung Myint |
| Assistant Manager | (Myanmar) U Nyunt Win |
| Assistant Manager | (Myanmar) U Kyaing Than |
| Goalkeeper Coach | (Myanmar) U Aye Thar |
| Fitness Coach | (Myanmar) U Nan Da Kyaw |
| Youth Team Head Coach | (Myanmar) U Aung Zaw Myo |

Source: Rakhine United FC

=== Other information ===
| Owner | (Myanmar) U Zaw Min Thein |
| C.E.O | (Myanmar) U Ye Naing Oo |
| Finance Officer | (Myanmar) Daw Nwe Ni Naing |
| Marketing Officer | (Myanmar) U Myo Min Naing |
| Admin Assistance | (Myanmar) U Lin Zaw Oo |
| Media Officer | (Myanmar) U Thet Htoo Naing Oo |
| Ground (capacity and dimensions) | Wai Thar Li Stadium (32,000 / 103x67 metres) |
| Training Ground | Wai Thar Li Stadium |

== General Aung San Shield ==
| Date | Round | Team 1 | Result | Team 2 |
|---|---|---|---|---|
| 27/4/2015 | 1st | Dagon FC | 1 – 4 | Rakhine United |
| 14/7/2015 | 2nd | Rakhine United | 2 – 0 | Nay Pyi Taw |
| 2/8/2015 | Quarter-final | Rakhine United | 7 – 2 | Manaw Myay |
| 19/8/2015 | Semi-final (1st leg) | Ayeyawady United | 2 – 0 | Rakhine United |
| 23/9/2015 | Semi-final (2nd leg) | Rakhine United | 0 – 1 | Ayeyawady United |

== Squad information ==
=== First team squad ===
As of 15 August 2015.

| Squad No. | Name | Nationality | Position(s) | Date of birth (age) |
Goalkeepers
| 1 | Thurakoko(1) | (Myanmar) | GK | |
| 18 | Soe Moe Kyaw | (Myanmar) | GK | |
| 33 | Jun Kochi | (Japan) | GK | |
Defenders
| 2 | Kyaw Naing Myint | (Myanmar) | RB | |
| 3 | Min Ko Thu | (Myanmar) | CB / DM | |
| 4 | Aung Thu Win | (Myanmar) | LB | |
| 6 | Nyan Lin Htet | (Myanmar) | CB | |
| 12 | Wai Phyo Lwin | (Myanmar) | CB / RB | |
| 13 | Pyae Phyo Ko Ko | (Myanmar) | LB | |
| 21 | Si Thu Than Soe | (Myanmar) | CB / RB | |
| 23 | Thi Ha Aung | (Myanmar) | LB | |
| 24 | Saw Win Htoo | (Myanmar) | CB | |
| 25 | Bernard Achaw | (Ghana) | CB | |
Midfielders
| 5 | Tun Tun Oo | (Myanmar) | CM / DM | |
| 7 | Naing Naing Kyaw | (Myanmar) | RW | |
| 8 | Marcio Santos | (Brazil) | AM | |
| 11 | Phyo Wai | (Myanmar) | LW / RW | |
| 14 | Saw Sein Ba Myint | (Myanmar) | RW | |
| 16 | Myat Kyaw Moe Oo | (Myanmar) | CM / AM | |
| 17 | Thurakoko(2) | (Myanmar) | CM / AM | |
| 20 | Aung Khine Tun | (Myanmar) | CM / AM | |
Strikers
| 9 | Aung Soe Moe (captain) | (Myanmar) | CF / RW | |
| 10 | Pyi Moe | (Myanmar) | CF | |
| 19 | Nyi Nyi Naing | (Myanmar) | CF | |
| 29 | Lar Ceu Luai | (Myanmar) | CF | |
