= Thuraakunu =

Thuraakunu ތުރާކުނު
- island
- Location in Maldives
- Coordinates: 7°6′18″N 72°54′07″E
- Country: Maldives
- Geographic atoll: Ihavandhippolhu Atoll
- Administrative atoll: Haa Alif Atoll
- Distance to Malé: 330.89 km (205.61 mi)

Government
  - Council: Thuraakunu Island Council

Dimensions
  - Length: 0.9 km (0.56 mi)
  - Width: 0.38 km (0.24 mi)

Population (2022)
  - Total: 427
- Time zone: UTC+05:00 (MST)
- Area code(s): 650, 20
- Thuraakunu Lighthouse
- Foundation: concrete base
- Construction: metal skeletal tower
- Shape: square pyramidal skeletal tower
- Focal height: 15 m (49 ft)
- Range: 10 nmi (19 km; 12 mi)
- Characteristic: Fl W 5s

Thuraakunu (Dhivehi: ތުރާކުނު) is the northernmost island in Maldives, one of the fourteen inhabited islands of Haa Alif Atoll and is geographically part of the Ihavandhippolhu Atoll in the Maldives. It is an island-level administrative constituency governed by the Thuraakunu Island Council.

== History ==
Thuraakunu is the closest island to Minicoy. Formerly there was direct trade between both, and fishermen from both islands used to visit each other. This exchange continued even after Minicoy became part of the Indian Union after independence. However, after 1956 the Indian government forbade these visits. Now, despite the geographical proximity and ethnographic similarities, people from both islands are not allowed to meet each other.

== Geography ==
The island is 330.89 km (206 mi; 179 nmi) north of the country's capital, Malé.

== Demography ==
Historical population
Year	Pop.	±%
2006	347	—
2014	393	+13.3%
2022	427	+8.7%
2006-2014-2022: Census populations Source:

== See also ==
- List of lighthouses in the Maldives
