= Dmytro Zhdanov =

Ukrainian footballer

Personal information
- Full name: Dmytro Mykolayovych Zhdanov
- Date of birth: 16 July 1996 (age 30)
- Place of birth: Ukraine
- Height: 1.82 m (5 ft 11 1/2 in)
- Position: Midfielder

Team information
- Current team: Stord IL
- Number: 28

Youth career
- 2008–2012: FC Stal Alchevsk
- 2012–2013: FC Shakhtar Donetsk

Senior career*
Years	Team	Apps	(Gls)
2013–2014	FC Stal Alchevsk	7	(0)
2015	FC Zorya Luhansk	0	(0)
2016	FC Avanhard Kramatorsk	6	(1)
2017–2018	Club Green Streets	55	(18)
2021–2022	FC Lyubomyr Stavyshche	0	(0)
2023	Sola FK	2	(0)
2023–	Stord IL	14	(0)
- * Club domestic league appearances and goals as of 25 June 2023

Dmytro Zhdanov (Ukrainian: Дмитро Миколайович Жданов; born 16 July 1996) is a Ukrainian professional footballer who plays as a midfielder for Stord IL.

== Career ==
He made his debut for Stal Alchevsk in the Ukrainian First League in 2014. Then in February 2015 Zhdanov signed a contract with FC Zorya.

He played for Zorya Luhansk in the Ukrainian Premier League.

In January 2017 he signed a contract with Maldivian football Club Green Streets, along with another two Ukrainian footballers. He made his debut for CGS in a match against Victory Sports Club on 25 February 2017.

In 2023 he moved to Norway where he signed for Sola FK. A couple of months later he left the club joining Stord IL instead.
