= Eydhafushi =

Eydhafushi އޭދަފުށި
- Inhabited island
- Location in Maldives
- Coordinates: 5°6.227′N 73°4.222′E
- Country: Maldives
- Administrative atoll: Baa Atoll
- Distance to Malé: 113.62 km (70.60 mi)

Government
  - Body: Eydhafushi Council
  - President: Mohamed Fathih (PPM)

Area
  - Total: 57 ha (140 acres)

Dimensions
  - Length: 1.22 km (0.76 mi)
  - Width: 0.60 km (0.37 mi)

Population (2022)
  - Total: 2,581
  - Density: 4,500/km^{2} (12,000/sq mi)
- Time zone: UTC+05:00 (MST)

Eydhafushi (Dhivehi: އޭދަފުށި) is the capital of Baa Atoll, which is an administrative division of the Maldives.

== History ==
Little is known about the history of Eydhafushi. The island's current population has been relatively recent, with estimated immigration of nearby islanders in the 17th–19th century.

In 1968, people from the nearby Maaddoo island, Funadhoo and Undoodhoo were immigrated to Eydhafushi under the supervision of the Maldivian government as they sought a better standard of living.

== Geography ==
The island is 113.62 km (71 mi; 61 nmi) northwest of the country's capital, Malé.

Eydhafushi is located at 05° 06' 10" north latitude and 73° 05' 15" east longitude. After land reclamation, the total area of Eydhafushi is now 58 ha (140 acres), including the part of the island expanded in 2015 by reclaiming the lagoon surrounding the island.

The island is part of the UNESCO-designated Baa Atoll Biosphere Reserve.

=== Climate ===
Eydhafushi has a tropical monsoon climate (Köppen: Am).

Climate data for Eydhafushi
| Month | Jan | Feb | Mar | Apr | May | Jun | Jul | Aug | Sep | Oct | Nov | Dec | Year |
|---|---|---|---|---|---|---|---|---|---|---|---|---|---|
| Mean daily maximum °C (°F) | 27.5 (81.5) | 27.7 (81.9) | 28.4 (83.1) | 28.8 (83.8) | 28.7 (83.7) | 28.4 (83.1) | 28.2 (82.8) | 28.0 (82.4) | 27.9 (82.2) | 27.8 (82.0) | 27.7 (81.9) | 27.6 (81.7) | 28.1 (82.5) |
| Daily mean °C (°F) | 26.9 (80.4) | 27.2 (81.0) | 27.8 (82.0) | 28.1 (82.6) | 27.9 (82.2) | 27.8 (82.0) | 27.5 (81.5) | 27.4 (81.3) | 27.1 (80.8) | 27.1 (80.8) | 26.9 (80.4) | 26.9 (80.4) | 27.4 (81.3) |
| Mean daily minimum °C (°F) | 26.3 (79.3) | 26.6 (79.9) | 27.1 (80.8) | 27.2 (81.0) | 26.9 (80.4) | 26.8 (80.2) | 26.6 (79.9) | 26.6 (79.9) | 26.3 (79.3) | 26.2 (79.2) | 26.1 (79.0) | 26.1 (79.0) | 26.6 (79.8) |
| Average precipitation mm (inches) | 69.8 (2.75) | 39.0 (1.54) | 54.6 (2.15) | 105.3 (4.15) | 228.2 (8.98) | 123.6 (4.87) | 141.8 (5.58) | 151.1 (5.95) | 189.1 (7.44) | 194.2 (7.65) | 235.0 (9.25) | 193.1 (7.60) | 1,724.8 (67.91) |
Source: Weather.Directory

== Demography ==
Historical population
| Year | Pop. | ±% |
|---|---|---|
| 2006 | 2,409 | — |
| 2014 | 2,554 | +6.0% |
| 2022 | 2,581 | +1.1% |
2006-2022: Census populations Source:

== Governance ==
Eydhafushi shares a parliamentary district with Hithaadhoo and Maalhos called Eydhafushi Dhaairaa. The current member of parliament is prominent Maldivian businessman Mr. Ahmed Saleem (Redwave Saleem) elected as a member of PPM.

=== Municipal Council ===
The island is administered by 5 elected councilors who are elected for a term of 3 years. The current members were elected from the Maldivian Democratic Party (MDP), and People's National Congress (PPM).

=== Atoll Council ===
The atoll is administered by 3 councilors. All of them represent the Maldivian Democratic Party (MDP).

== Economy ==
=== Fishing ===
In the past, fishing was the major income for the local people. The tourism industry has grown in the last few years leading to an increase in employment.

=== Retail ===
Eydhafushi has more than 20 shops and markets that serve the island population along with the whole atoll population. These include food and consumer product stores, hardware stores, electronic shops, building materials, fabric stores, boutiques and automobile showrooms.

=== Tourism ===
The island current economy is supported by people working in the resorts and construction industry. With the increasing number of tourist resorts nearby, the local people began to prefer working in the resorts mainly due to the better salaries the jobs offer.

== Education ==
Baa Atoll Education Centre is the first Maldivian government school established outside of Male', and was inaugurated on 24 February 1978 by the then Minister of Education Abdul Sattar Moosa Didi. The school currently teaches up to 12th grade.

== Healthcare ==
Healthcare services are provided by the Baa Atoll Hospital, which offers general medical care and some specialist services to island residents and those from surrounding islands. Apart from this, there are some private clinics offering niche healthcare services.

== Transportation ==
The island is connected to the rest of the country primarily by sea. Regular ferry services and speedboats link Eydhafushi to nearby islands and Malé. The closest airport is Dharavandhoo Domestic Airport, located on a nearby island, which provides flights to Malé and other regional destinations. RTL ferry service is expected to connect the atoll through new speedboats this year.

== Notable people ==
- Abdul Wahid Hussain
- Mohamed Shaffaz
- Mohamed Jameel
- Mohamed Sifan
- Shafiu Ahmed
- Ali Fasir
- Hamza Mohamed
- Haisham Hassan
- Ishan Ibrahim
- Mohamed Fasir
- Ahmed Nazeer
- Redwave Saleem
