= Kolhufushi (Meemu Atoll) =

Kolhufushi ކޮޅުފުށި
- Inhabited island
- Location in Maldives
- Coordinates: 02°46′48″N 73°25′30″E
- Country: Maldives
- Administrative atoll: Meemu Atoll
- Distance to Malé: 154.57 km (96.05 mi)

Dimensions
  - Length: 2.475 km (1.538 mi)
  - Width: 0.450 km (0.280 mi)

Population (2022)
  - Total: 793
- Time zone: UTC+05:00 (MST)
- Kolhufushi Lighthouse
- Construction: concrete (foundation), metal (tower)
- Height: 12 m (39 ft)
- Shape: square pyramidal skeletal tower
- Markings: Grey (tower), Rectangle (black, daymark)
- Power source: solar power
- Focal height: 15 m (49 ft)
- Range: 10 nmi (19 km; 12 mi)
- Characteristic: Fl(2) W 10s

Kolhufushi (Dhivehi: ކޮޅުފުށި, pronounced [koɭufuʂiː]) is an inhabited island off the southwest coast of Meemu Atoll or Mulaku Atoll. It is the third most populous island in Meemu Atoll.

== History ==
=== 2004 tsunami and aftermath ===
The island was greatly affected by the 2004 tsunami, although coral reefs took some of the impact. The island's chief, Mr. Sigee, described the water as reaching his chin. Two weeks after the disaster, the island's population was found to have lost at least sixteen people, and the island's mango and banana trees had been poisoned by the saltwater. Some homes and a century-old mosque had also been destroyed. Most of the other houses were unsuitable for habitation, leaving only a handful of functional homes. Before relief teams arrived, and due to the houses being unsuitable for life, the population resorted to tents around the island and resorted to eating seaweed.

By mid-January 2005, 8% of the 13,000-strong displaced Maldivian population was housed in temporary shelters on Kolhufushi. The construction of 55 replacement houses was started in October 2008, and a further 168 houses were started in 2010.

Tsunami drills were introduced on the island in 2018. A tsunami warning in 2016 had uncovered a lack of preparedness for dealing with safe evacuation.

The island was supposedly split in half after the Tsunami, the south half is the one that is currently inhabited, The northern half is used for cultivation.

Kolhufushi has a mosque near its south coast where Muhammad Thakurufaanu al-Auzam and his team's vessel Kalhuohfumi was dismantled and turned into the Mosque, "Masjid-Ul-Thakurufaan” or more commonly, “Thakurufaanu Miskiyy”

== Geography ==
The island is 154.57 km (96 mi; 83 nmi) south of the country's capital, Malé. The land area of the island is 61.1 ha (151 acres) in 2018. The island was described as having an area of 75.6 ha (187 acres) in 2007.

== Demography ==
Historical population
Year	Pop.	±%
2006	811	—
2014	702	−13.4%
2022	793	+13.0%
2006-2022: Census populations Source:

== Infrastructure ==
The island is split into 2 divisions, the split being the harbour's middle. The divisions are the Uthuru Avah (Northern Division) and the Dhekunu Avah (Southern Division) This division has no officiality.

Kolhufushi has 3 mosques, 2 of which are used in mass such as Salat-Ul-Juma’ah and Eid prayers. These two mosques are located in different divisions of the island, being one for each division. The Uthuru Avah has Noor Miskiyy and the Dhekunu Avah has Viaam Miskiyy. while Masjid-Ul-Thakurufaan is in the Dhekunu avah but is used for short prayers. A cemetery is also located next to Masjid-Ul-Thakurufaan.

Most residents live in small houses with around 4-5 rooms, a backyard mostly used for gardening or storage, and a separate area for the kitchen.

Kolhufushi has a handful of stores and a few cafes. The island has 2 Football pitches, all of which in the Uthuru avah.

The construction of Kolhufushi's harbour was contracted in January 2016, and was completed the following year. The harbour was inaugurated in 2018.

== Utilities ==
Electrification on Kolhufushi was undertaken by the Maldives Transport and Contracting Company (MTCC)in 2013. A submarine cable network was laid to the island, by Ooredoo Maldives, in 2017. The island has a sewage system as well.

== Health Care ==
Kolhufushi has a pharmacy and a health center, Which oreviously broke down in the 2004 Tsunami and was rebuilt and funded by the German Red Cross Deutsches Rote Kreuz. For further and more complicated illnesses, most patients resort to the capital, Malé.

== Education ==
The island holds one school (Meemu Atoll School) for grades 1–12, and a pre-school (Kolhufushi Pre-school) for Baby Nursery and Kindergarten. Both schools are up to Maldivian standards and the Meemu Atoll School has the GSCE exams, O and A level exams.

== Sports and Recreation ==
The island has a football team. The team won every one of their group games at the 2017 Haf Islanders Cup, but lost to Male' in the semi-final.

Many famous futsal and football players from Kolhufushi play for numerous Malé and Hulhumalé teams.

Eid festivals such as Bodumas, Bodu beru and many others are also widespread amongst the community in Kolhufushi.

A number of football teams also exist in kolhufushi alongside a football tournament. A fishing competition also takes place in the island.

== Transport ==
Common speedboat trips arrive from other atolls to Kolufushi, including Malé; Which takes 2 hours to 2 hours and 30 minutes.

As of now, Kolhufushi does not have a road and the nearest airport is the Muli Airport.

There are currently no asphalt roads. the most common form of land transport is by motorbike. Cars are very uncommon, and the island has a pickup service.

== See also ==
- List of lighthouses in the Maldives
