= Jun Kochi =

Japanese footballer

Jun Kochi 東風 淳
Personal information
- Date of birth: 22 May 1983 (age 43)
- Place of birth: Tokyo, Japan
- Height: 1.80 m (5 ft 11 in)
- Position: Goalkeeper

Team information
- Current team: Master 7 FC
- Number: 81

Youth career
- 1998–2001: Mitsubishi Yowa S.C.

Senior career*
Years	Team	Apps	(Gls)
2002–2006	Kokushikan University S.C.		
2007–2008	Fujieda MY F.C.		
2008	YSCC Yokohama		
2009	Albirex Niigata		
2010−2011	Army United F.C.		
2012	Chonburi		
2012	→ Sriracha		
2013–2014	Pattaya United F.C.		
2015	Rakhine United F.C.		
2016	Brothers Union		
2016	New Radiant S.C.		
2017	Club Green Streets		
2018	Club Valencia		
2019	Tokyo 23		
2020–2022	Taichung Futuro	6	(0)
2023–2024	Viengchanh		
- * Club domestic league appearances and goals

Jun Kochi (東風 淳, Kochi Jun; born 22 May 1983 in Tokyo) is a Japanese professional football goalkeeper.

== Career ==
In 2015, Kochi joined Rakhine United F.C. for one season and left the club after the season was over.

In January 2017, he signed a contract with Maldivian football Club Green Streets, along with three Ukrainian footballers.
