= Stevan Marković (footballer) =

Montenegrin footballer

Personal information
- Date of birth: 31 January 1988 (age 38)
- Place of birth: Bar, SFR Yugoslavia
- Height: 1.95 m (6 ft 5 in)
- Position: Centre back

Team information
- Current team: Team Wellington
- Number: 19

Youth career
- 1996–2002: Vojvodina
- 2002–2007: Mornar

Senior career*
Years	Team	Apps	(Gls)
2007–2010	Mornar	27	(1)
2010	Grbalj	12	(1)
2011–2012	OFK Beograd	19	(0)
2012	Kukësi	0	(0)
2013	Mornar	3	(0)
2013	Sinđelić Beograd	14	(1)
2014	Dečić	5	(0)
2015–2016	Mornar	39	(1)
2016	Lovćen	8	(0)
2017	New Radiant	22	(4)
2018	UTA Arad	6	(0)
2018–2019	Mornar	26	(1)
2019–	Team Wellington	8	(0)
- * Club domestic league appearances and goals as of 20 September 2020

Stevan Marković (Cyrillic: Стеван Mapкoвић, born 31 January 1988) is a Montenegrin football defender who plays for Team Wellington in New Zealand's ISPS Handa Premiership.

== Club career ==
He had previously played with OFK Grbalj and FK Mornar. in the Montenegrin First League. He played with OFK Beograd in the Serbian SuperLiga between 2010 and 2012.

=== Team Wellington ===
On 22 October 2019 it was announced that Marković had signed with New Zealand club Team Wellington to play in the 2019–20 ISPS Handa Premiership.
