= Mohamed Azzam =

Maldivian professional footballer

Personal information
- Full name: Mohamed Azzam
- Date of birth: 13 February 1990 (age 36)
- Place of birth: Maldives
- Positions: Defender; midfielder

Team information
- Current team: TC Sports
- Number: 21

Senior career*
Years	Team	Apps	(Gls)
- Maziya
2012–2014	BG Sports		
2015–2021	TC Sports		

International career
2017	Maldives	1	(0)
- * Club domestic league appearances and goals

Mohamed Azzam (born 13 February 1990) is a Maldivian professional footballer who plays for TC Sports Club.

== International ==
Azzam was first called up for Maldives national football team in March 2017 for 2019 AFC Asian Cup qualification match against Palestine at home, but was on bench as an unused substitute. He made his debut against Oman on 10 October 2017, in the 2019 AFC Asian Cup qualification match. He came in as a 70th-minute substitute for Naiz Hassan.
