= Candela (footballer) =

Spanish footballer

Personal information
- Full name: Ángel Luis Ruiz Paz
- Date of birth: 12 January 1987 (age 39)
- Place of birth: La Puebla de Montalbán, Spain
- Height: 1.77 m (5 ft 9 1/2 in)
- Position: Midfielder

Youth career
- Real Madrid
- Odelot Toletum

Senior career*
| Years | Team | Apps | (Gls) |
| 2006–2008 | Albacete B | | |
| 2007 | Albacete | 2 | (0) |
| 2008–2010 | Celta B | 61 | (0) |
| 2009 | Celta | 1 | (0) |
| 2010–2011 | Montañeros | 33 | (1) |
| 2011–2013 | Albacete | 40 | (3) |
| 2013–2014 | Pontevedra | 16 | (0) |
| 2014–2015 | Horn | 50 | (1) |
| 2015–2016 | First Vienna | 24 | (0) |
| 2016–2017 | Barakaldo | 4 | (0) |
| 2017 | La Roda | 10 | (0) |
| 2017–2018 | New Radiant | | |
| 2019 | Atlético Tomelloso | 16 | (0) |
| 2019–2021 | Ibañés | 52 | (3) |
| 2021–2024 | Huracán Balazote | 53 | (2) |
- * Club domestic league appearances and goals as of 12 May 2024

Ángel Luis Ruiz Paz (born 12 January 1987), known as Candela, is a Spanish professional footballer who plays as a defensive midfielder.
