= Maalhos (Alif Alif Atoll) =

Maalhos މާޅޮސް
- Inhabited island
- Location in Maldives
- Coordinates: 03°59′08″N 72°43′05″E
- Country: Maldives
- Administrative atoll: Alif Alif Atoll
- Distance to Malé: 90.28 km (56.10 mi)

Dimensions
  - Length: 0.975 km (0.606 mi)
  - Width: 0.375 km (0.233 mi)

Population (2022)
  - Total: 516
- Time zone: UTC+05:00 (MST)
- Maalhos Lighthouse
- Foundation: concrete base
- Construction: metal skeletal tower
- Shape: square pyramidal skeletal tower
- Range: 10 nmi (19 km; 12 mi)
- Characteristic: Fl(2) W 10s

Maalhos (Dhivehi: މާޅޮސް) is one of the inhabited islands of Ari Atoll, belonging to the Alif Alif Atoll administrative division.

== Geography ==
The island is 90.28 km (56 mi; 49 nmi) west of the country's capital, Malé. Maalhos is the westernmost island of Ari Atoll.

== Demography ==
Historical population
Year	Pop.	±%
2006	248	—
2014	408	+64.5%
2022	516	+26.5%
2006-2022: Census populations Source:

== See also ==
- List of lighthouses in the Maldives
