= Milandhoo =

Milandhoo މިލަންދޫ
- Inhabited island
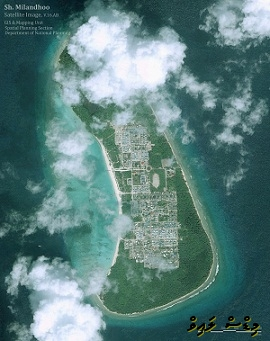
- Shaviyani Milandhoo satellite photo

- Location in Maldives
- Coordinates: 06°17′05″N 73°14′36″E
- Country: Maldives
- Geographic atoll: Miladhummadulhu Atoll
- Administrative atoll: Shaviyani Atoll
- Distance to Malé: 235.12 km (146.10 mi)

Government
  - Council President: Abdullah Athif

Population (2022)
  - Total: 2,094
- Time zone: UTC+05:00 (MST)

Milandhoo (Dhivehi: މިލަންދޫ) is an island in the Shaviyani Atoll administrative division of the Maldives and geographically part of the Miladhummadulhu group in Thiladhunmati Atoll.

== History ==
Milandhoo was uninhabited in 1997, when the Maldive's Minister of Atolls Abdulla Hameed launched a project to construct houses there and relocate residents from the neighboring island Maakandoodhoo, where the water had become contaminated. The resettlement was hastened in 2004, when the Boxing Day tsunami severely damaged Maakandoodhoo. The government officially recognized Milandhoo as an inhabited island on 20 March 2005. With more than 2140 residents, it is now the most populous island in Shaviyani Atoll.

== Geography ==
The island is 235.12 km (146 mi; 127 nmi) north of the country's capital, Malé.

Milandhoo is at 06°17′05″N 73°14′36″E in the southeast of Shaviyani atoll between Maakandoodhoo and Nalandhoo. Covering 126 hectares, Milandhoo is the largest island in the atoll.

In northwestern Milandhoo is a lake, Sikundi Kulhi ("Prawn Lake"), so named because of its abundant prawns and shrimp, which are transparent and up to 1.5 inches (38 mm) long. Barracudas and a few other fish species also inhabit the lake, while crabs and hermit crabs live around its shore. Sikundi Kulhi is about 350 ft (110 m) long, 250 ft (76 m) wide, and up to 5 ft (1.5 m) deep. Clay deposited at its center is used for traditional medicine. Bottle gourd plants, ironwood, sea hibiscus and mangroves are common nearby, while great morinda and coconut palm are rare.

In southwestern Milandhoo is a pond, Rayy Kulhi ("Red Pond"), so named because debris from bottle gourd plants and mangroves in the surrounding swamp redden its water. It is smaller and shallower than Sikundi Kulhi, but a popular picnic destination.

== Demography ==
Historical population
Year	Pop.	±%
2006	1,637	—
2014	1,785	+9.0%
2022	2,094	+17.3%
2006-2014-2022: Census populations Source:

== Economy ==
=== Agriculture ===
Plantain is Milandhoo's main agricultural product and has been grown commercially there since 2006, on farms from 2,000 sq ft (190 m^{2}) to 12,000 sq ft (1,100 m^{2}) in size. Farmers sell the plantains throughout Shaviyani Atoll and in Malé. Clearing for agriculture has been causing deforestation.
