= 2015 New Radiant S.C. season =

New Radiant
2015 season
- Chairman: Ali Waheed
- Head Coach: Mika Lönnström (Until 2 March 2015) Sobah Mohamed (player-caretaker) (Until 11 March 2015); Amir Alagic (Until 12 April 2015) Vaccent (Since 12 April 2015)
- Stadium: National Football Stadium
- Dhivehi Premier League: Not started
- FA Cup: Not started
- President's Cup: Not started
- AFC Cup: Group stage
- FA Charity Shield: Final
- Top goalscorer: League: All: Ashad Ali (2 goals)
Home colours	Away colours

During the 2015 Dhivehi football season, New Radiant S.C. is competing in the inaugural season of the Dhivehi Premier League.

The 2015 season is New Radiant Sports Club's 36th year in existence as a football club. New Radiant also participate in the AFC Cup this season, qualifying directly for the group stage by finishing first in the 2014 Dhivehi League.

== Month by month review ==
=== December 2014 ===
On 13 December 2014, New Radiant finalized the staff officials for their youth team to prepare for the 2015 FAM Youth Championship. Former player and assistant coach of New Radiant was appointed as the head coach of the youth team and former players Sobah Mohamed and Fareed Mohamed were appointed as the assistant coaches. Mohamed Hamdhaan was appointed as the manager and Irushan Ahmed as the assistant manager, while Niushad Ali as the goalkeeper coach and Assad Mohamed as the kit official.

New Radiant announced their first signing for the upcoming season Ashad Ali for two years from Maziya on 15 December 2014. He was given the number 9 shirt vacated after the retirement of club legend Ahmed Thoriq after the 2014 season. Chairman Ali Waheed described the signing of Ashad as, "This is the start of the next big thing".

On 18 December 2014, it was announced that New Radiant was ranked 94 out of the list of 147 Asian clubs in the AFC Club Ranking. This is also the highest rank by a Maldivian football club.

On the same day, New Radiant former player Rilwan Waheed re-signs for New Radiant on a two years deal after being released from Maziya. He was given the number 8 jersey, being vacated after Shamweel Qasim left the club during the 2014 season.

New Radiant received a special recognition letter from the FIFA president Sepp Blatter on 21 December 2014. In the letter, Blatter highlighting the contribution the club has made to the develop of football in the Maldives and the achievements made in the domestic and international tournaments.

During the ceremony held in the Football Association of Maldives to receive the special recognition letter by the FIFA president Sepp Blatter, chairman Ali Waheed announced the extension of the contract of team head-coach Mika Lönnström until the end of the 2015 season.

On 25 December 2014, captain and goalkeeper Imran Mohamed departed New Radiant to join the rival Maziya, after a successful 3 years with the club having played 82 games and scoring 1 goal. He left after winning 3 Dhivehi Leagues, 3 President's Cups, 2 Charity Shields and one FA Cup.

On the following day, 26 December 2014, New Radiant announced the signing of Spain goalkeeper Pedro Marenco from Loyola Meralco Sparks. Along with Marenco, club also signed goalkeeper Mohamed Yamaan from Club AYL under a 2 years contract.

On 27 December 2014, New Radiant announced the signing of the former Club AYL Brazilian playmaker Everton Souza Santos. He claimed the number 11 jersey as Ali Fasir was handed number 7 worn by New Radiant legend Ali Ashfaq.

On 28 December 2014, New Radiant announced another signing of a Brazilian striker Rafael Betim Marti from Sport Clube União Torreense and he was handed the number 10 jersey worn by Mohamed Umair as Umair claimed the number 37.

On 29 December 2014, New Radiant appointed Ismail Wisham as the club's new General Secretary as Ahmed Thoriq resigns from his job after retirement from football.

Defender Mohamed Shifan signed a new 2-year extension on 30 December 2014.

=== January 2015 ===
On 3 January 2015, Akram Abdul Ghanee extended his contract to 2 years and two days later Mohamed Rasheed extended his contract to 5 years while Hamza Mohamed also signed a 5-year deal with the club on 8 January 2015.

On 10 January 2015, New Radiant announced that Mohamed Umair will captain the club for the 2015 season while Ali Fasir remains as the vice captain. Umair and Fasir were the vice captains of the 2014 season.

On 21 January 2015, New Radiant unveiled their new kits for the 2015 season.

On 22 January 2015, New Radiant were defeated by 1–0 to PDRM FA in their first match of the 2015 People of Maldives Invitational Soccer Cup; a friendly invitational pre-season tournament in Maldives. They were also beaten 3–1 by LionsXII on 24 January 2015 in the second match where Ahmed Niyaz scored the only goal. New Radiant's Mohamed Rasheed was sent off during the last 15 minutes of the game for the dangerous foul on LionsXII's Wahyudi Wahid and the club not only made Mohamed Rasheed to apologise from Wahydui Wahid and LionsXII but also from New Radiant's players and the supporters also. managed to end the tournament with a single point after a goalless draw against Maziya in the final group stage match of the tournament on 26 January 2015. Mohamed Shifan was shown a direct red card for using foul language against the assistant referee in this match.

=== February 2015 ===
On 4 February 2015, New Radiant terminated captain Mohamed Umair's contract on mutual consent and signed to the rival side Maziya on a 1-year contract. Umair was under a heavy criticism from the club's fans because he was not being able to play at his peak throughout the pre-season friendly tournament POMIS Cup, and a club official also confirmed to the media that the club and the player believes that it will be the best decision for both club and for the player.

New Radiant also terminated the contract of three foreign players; Pedro Marenco, Everton Souza Santos and Rafael Betim Marti on 5 February 2015 as they could not impress the team officials during the 2015 POMIS Cup. Later that day, Everton Souza Santos and Rafael Betim Marti signed to the T.C. Sports.

On 6 February 2015, New Radiant traveled to K. Thulusdhoo to play a friendly match, where a very youthful New Radiant team they defeated the Thulusdhoo team by 13–0. Hamza Mohamed scored 5 goals, Ahmed Suhail, Mohamed Samir and Isham Ibrahim scored twice while Shafiu Ahmed and Akram Abdul Ghanee scored 1 goal each.

On 10 February 2015, New Radiant announced the signing of David Moli from Boreham Wood and Viliam Macko from Ang Thong. Later that day, club also announced the signing of final two foreign slots; Patrick Sunday Okoro from the Al-Ahli Club of Atbara and Alisher Akhmedov from FC Gefest.

On 14 February 2015, New Radiant defeated Dhiffushi in a friendly game 7–1, with David Moli's hat-trick, Viliam Macko's brace, Ahmed Suhail and Mohamed Shifan's goals on the score sheet. They were defeated 2–1 by the newly promoted T.C. Sports Club in a friendly match played on 19 February 2015, Okoro scoring their only goal.

Following the departure of newly appointed captain Mohamed Umair, New Radiant appointed their new signing Ashad Ali as the captain for the 2015 season, on 20 February 2015. Mohamed Shifan was declared as their third-captain on the same day, while Ali Fasir remains as the vice-captain.

On 25 February 2015, New Radiant played their first game of the season, in the 2015 AFC Cup against Indonesian side Persib Bandung and they lost 4–1 at the Jalak Harupat Soreang Stadium, where captain Ashad Ali scored their only goal of the match.

=== March 2015 ===
On 2 March 2015, club terminated the contract of coach Mika Lönnström and also the contract of assistant coach Ismail Anil on the following day. New Radiant appointed their defender Sobah Mohamed as the caretaker until the arrival of a new head-coach.

On the match day, New Radiant appointed Amir Alagic from Bosnia and Herzegovina as their new head coach before the match but played theirsecond AFC Cup match under the instruction of Sobah Mohamed and won 2–1 at home, against Lao Toyota FC of Laos, Okoro coming from behind to score the equalizer and captain Ashad converting it from the spot to score the winner, in just two minutes remaining for the full-time.

On 12 March 2015, New Radiant announced their new signing Mohamed Shaffaz. New Radiant were defeated in the AFC Cup third game against Ayeyawady United of Myanmar 3–0 at home, in the first game under coach Amir Alagic.

=== April 2015 ===
On 5 April 2015, Club terminated the contract with the Nigerian player Okoro.

New Radiant played the Maldivian football season opening match against Maziya on 6 April 2015, where they lost 2–0 at the 2015 Maldivian FA Charity Shield. On 12 April 2015, coach Alagic resigned from the position of team head-coach due to some family issues, and Sobah again took the responsibility as a player-assistant coach. Club ended their AFC Cup away match as a goalless draw; the second match under Sobah, on 15 April 2015.

On 20 April 2015, New Radiant played their first Dhivehi Premier League match, winning crucially against Victory; 3–1. Viliam took the lead in the first half with the help of Ibrahim Fazeel but the score got leveled in the last 15 minutes. When Rilwan Waheed was sent off for attacking a player out of play, club sealed the victory from a Fazeel's penalty in the first minute of the injury time and another was scored in the last second by Ali Fasir, playing with 10 men.

On 23 April 2015, FAM announced in a press release, that based on the 37th clause on disciplinary code, they have decided to suspend Mohamed Rasheed for seven games of 2015 Dhivehi Premier League with a fine of MVR 15,000, for his conduct during the LionsXII match in the People's Cup on 24 January 2015, based on the match commissioners report and match referee's report.

== Club ==
=== Coaching staff ===
Position	Staff
Manager	(Maldives) Ahmed Zareer
Chairman	(Maldives) Ali Waheed
Vice Chairman	(Maldives) Hassan Shujau
Head coach	Vaccent
Assistant coach	(Maldives) Sobah Mohamed (player-coach)
Goalkeeper trainer	(Maldives) Hassan Hameed
Director of Football	(Maldives) Anwar Ali
Official	(Maldives) Hussain Abdulla
Official	(Maldives) Ahmed Rasheed
Official	(Maldives) Ibrahim Shareef

=== Other information ===
General Secretary	(Maldives) Ismail Wisham
Board Directors	(Maldives) Aishath Leesha (Maldives) Adheel Ismail (Maldives) Ibrahim Shaaz Habeeb (Maldives) Adam Ziyad (Maldives) Ali Shareef (Maldives) Ahmed Rameez (Maldives) Mohamed Shafeeq
Ground (capacity and dimensions)	National Football Stadium (11,850 / 103x67 metres)
Training Ground	FAM Turf 1

Source: New Radiant S.C.

== Kit ==
Supplier: TBA / Sponsor: Milo

Home	Away	Goalkeeper 1	Goalkeeper 2

== First-team squad ==
As of 12 March 2015.

Note: Flags indicate national team as defined under FIFA eligibility rules; some limited exceptions apply. Players may hold more than one non-FIFA nationality.

No.	Pos.	Nation	Player
1	GK	UZB	Alisher Akhmedov
3	MF	MDV	Mohamed Shifan (3rd captain)
4	DF	MDV	Ahmed Abdulla
5	MF	MDV	Ibrahim Fazeel
6	MF	MDV	Mohamed Shaffaz
7	MF	MDV	Ali Fasir (vice-captain)
8	DF	MDV	Rilwan Waheed
9	FW	MDV	Ashad Ali (captain)
10	FW	ENG	David Moli
11	MF	SVK	Viliam Macko
13	MF	MDV	Akram Abdul Ghanee
14	FW	MDV	Ahmed Hassan

No.	Pos.	Nation	Player
15	DF	MDV	Abdulla Naajee
16	FW	MDV	Ahmed Suhail
17	FW	MDV	Hamza Mohamed
18	GK	MDV	Ahmed Fairooz
19	DF	MDV	Mohamed Rasheed
21	MF	MDV	Ali Shaamiu
22	MF	MDV	Mohamed Karam
23	MF	MDV	Ahmed Niyaz
24	FW	MDV	Mohamed Samir
25	GK	MDV	Mohamed Yamaan
26	DF	MDV	Shafiu Ahmed
27	DF	MDV	Sobah Mohamed

== Pre-season ==
=== 2015 POMIS Cup ===
22 January 2015 1	PDRM (Malaysia)	1–0	(Maldives) New Radiant	Malé
21:00	Sumareh 63'	Report		Stadium: National Football Stadium; Referee: Shifan Abdul Raheem (Maldives)

24 January 2015 2	New Radiant (Maldives)	1–3	(Singapore) LionsXII	Malé
16:00	Niyaz 85'	Report	4' Firdaus; 49' Madhu; 59' Amri	Stadium: National Football Stadium; Referee: Ali Zaeem (Maldives)

26 January 2015 3	New Radiant (Maldives)	0–0	(Maldives) Maziya	Malé
16:00		Report		Stadium: National Football Stadium; Referee: Shifan Abdul Raheem (Maldives)

=== Friendlies ===
6 February 2015 Friendly	Thulusdhoo	0–13	New Radiant	Thulusdhoo
16:00		Report (Dhivehi)	Hamza; Suhail; Samir; Isham; Shafiu; Akram	Stadium: Thulusdhoo Football Ground

14 February 2015 Friendly	Dhiffushi	1–7	New Radiant	Dhiffushi
16:00		Report (Dhivehi)	Moli; Viliam; Suhail; Shifan	Stadium: Dhiffushi Football Ground

19 February 2015 Friendly	New Radiant	1–2	T.C. Sports Club	Malé
16:00	Okoro	Report (Dhivehi)	Naiz; Rafinha	Stadium: National Football Stadium

== Competitions ==
=== Overall ===
Competition	Started round	Final position / round	First match	Last match
AFC Cup	Group stage		25 February 2015	
FA Charity Shield	Final	Runners-up	6 April 2015	
Dhivehi Premier League	—		20 April 2015	
FA Cup				
President's Cup				

=== Competition record ===
Competition	Record							
Competition	G	W	D	L	GF	GA	GD	Win %
AFC Cup	4	1	1	2	3	8	−5	25.00
FA Charity Shield	1	0	0	1	0	2	−2	0.00
Dhivehi Premier League	0	0	0	0	0	0	+0	—
FA Cup	0	0	0	0	0	0	+0	—
President's Cup	0	0	0	0	0	0	+0	—
Total	5	1	1	3	3	8	−5	20.00

=== AFC Cup ===
==== Group stage ====
Pos	Team	Pld	W	D	L	GF	GA	GD	Pts	Qualification	PSB	AYE	NRA	LAO
1	(Indonesia) Persib Bandung	6	3	3	0	10	5	+5	12	Advance to knockout stage	—	3–3	4–1	1–0
2	(Myanmar) Ayeyawady United	6	2	4	0	13	9	+4	10	Advance to knockout stage	1–1	—	0–0	4–3
3	(Maldives) New Radiant	6	1	2	3	4	10	−6	5		0–1	0–3	—	2–1
4	(Laos) Lao Toyota	6	0	3	3	7	10	−3	3		0–0	2–2	1–1	—

Source: AFC
Rules for classification: Group stage tiebreakers

25 February 2015 1	Persib Bandung (Indonesia)	4–1	(Maldives) New Radiant	Bandung
15:00 UTC+7	Jufriyanto 14'; Konaté 42'; Atep 45+1'; Yandi 90+2'	Report	60' Ashad	Stadium: Jalak Harupat Soreang Stadium; Attendance: 15,000; Referee: Fu Ming (China)

11 March 2015 2	New Radiant (Maldives)	2–1	(Laos) Lao Toyota FC	Malé
16:00 UTC+5	Okoro 69'; Ashad 88' (pen.)	Report	38' Maitee Sihalath	Stadium: National Football Stadium; Attendance: 2,375; Referee: Liu Kwok Man (Hong Kong)

18 March 2015 3	New Radiant (Maldives)	0–3	(Myanmar) Ayeyawady United	Malé
16:00 UTC+5		Report	34' Fonseca; 86', 90+3' Naumov	Stadium: National Football Stadium; Attendance: 2,452; Referee: Mohd Nafeez Abdul Wahab (Malaysia)

15 April 2015 4	Ayeyawady United (Myanmar)	0–0	(Maldives) New Radiant	Yangon
15:30 UTC+6:30		Report		Stadium: Thuwunna Stadium; Attendance: 200; Referee: Khurram Shahzad (Pakistan)

29 April 2015 5	New Radiant (Maldives)	0–1	(Indonesia) Persib Bandung	Malé
16:00 UTC+5		Report	Ridwan 14'	Stadium: National Football Stadium; Attendance: 500; Referee: Võ Minh Trí (Vietnam)

13 May 2015 6	Lao Toyota FC (Laos)	v	(Maldives) New Radiant	Vientiane
TBC UTC+7		Report		Stadium: New Laos National Stadium

=== FA Charity Shield ===
6 April 2015 Final	New Radiant	0–2	Maziya	Malé
21:00 UTC+05:00		Report	34' Rodríguez; 90+2' Nashid	Stadium: National Football Stadium

=== Dhivehi Premier League ===
==== League table ====
Pos	Team	Pld	W	D	L	GF	GA	GD	Pts	Qualification or relegation
1	New Radiant (C)	14	10	3	1	27	13	+14	33	Advance to 2016 AFC Cup Group Stage 2016 Dhivehi Premier League
2	TC Sports Club	14	8	5	1	26	12	+14	29	Advance to 2016 Dhivehi Premier League
3	Club Eagles	14	6	6	2	24	13	+11	24	Advance to 2016 Dhivehi Premier League
4	Maziya	14	6	3	5	26	20	+6	21	Advance to 2016 Dhivehi Premier League
5	Victory	14	5	2	7	23	23	0	17	Advance to 2016 Dhivehi Premier League

Source: rsssf.com
Rules for classification: 1) points; 2) goal difference; 3) number of goals scored.
(C) Champions

==== Results summary ====
Overall								Round 1						Round 2					
Pld	W	D	L	GF	GA	GD	Pts	W	D	L	GF	GA	GD	W	D	L	GF	GA	GD
1	1	0	0	3	1	+2	3	1	0	0	3	1	+2	0	0	0	0	0	0

Last updated: 20 April 2015

==== Results by matchday ====
Matchday	1	2	3	4	5	6	7	8	9	10	11	12	13	14
Round	1							2						
Result	W													
Position	2													

Last updated: 20 April 2015.

==== Matches ====
20 April 2015 1	New Radiant	3–1	Victory	National Football Stadium, Malé
22:00	Viliam 19'; Rilwan (red card) 86'; Fazeel 90+1' (pen.); Ashad (yellow card) 90+2'; Alisher (yellow card) 90+4'; Fasir 90+5'	Report	(yellow card) 16' Ismail; 74' (yellow card) 90+1' Ziaan	Referee: Shifan Abdul Raheem (Maldives)

5 May 2015 2	New Radiant	–	TC Sports	National Football Stadium, Malé
16:00		[ Report]

21 May 2015 3	New Radiant	–	BG Sports	National Football Stadium, Malé
16:00		[ Report]

2 June 2015 4	New Radiant	–	Mahibadhoo	National Football Stadium, Malé
21:00		[ Report]

24 June 2015 5	New Radiant	–	Valencia	National Football Stadium, Malé
16:00		[ Report]

1 July 2015 6	New Radiant	–	Eagles	National Football Stadium, Malé
16:00		[ Report]

8 July 2015 7	New Radiant	–	Maziya	National Football Stadium, Malé
16:00		[ Report]

=== FA Cup ===
–	Malé
[ Report]	Stadium: National Football Stadium

=== President's Cup ===
–	Malé
[ Report]	Stadium: National Football Stadium

== Statistics ==
=== Appearances ===
Last updated: 29 April 2015.

No.	Pos.	Name	League		FA Cup		President's Cup		AFC Cup		Charity Shield		Total		Discipline	
No.	Pos.	Name	Apps	Goals	Apps	Goals	Apps	Goals	Apps	Goals	Apps	Goals	Apps	Goals	Yellow card	Red card
1	GK	(Uzbekistan) Alisher Akhmedov	1	0	0	0	0	0	5	0	1	0	7	0	1	0
3	DF	(Maldives) Mohamed Sifan	1	0	0	0	0	0	5	0	1	0	7	0	0	0
4	DF	(Maldives) Ahmed Abdulla	1	0	0	0	0	0	4(1)	0	1	0	6(1)	0	0	0
5	MF	(Maldives) Ibrahim Fazeel	1	1	0	0	0	0	0	0	1	0	2	1	0	0
6	MF	(Maldives) Mohamed Shaffaz	0	0	0	0	0	0	0	0	0(1)	0	0(1)	0	0	0
7	MF	(Maldives) Ali Fasir	0(1)	1	0	0	0	0	0(2)	0	0	0	0(3)	1	0	0
8	DF	(Maldives) Rilwan Waheed	0(1)	0	0	0	0	0	3(2)	0	1	0	4(3)	0	0	1
9	FW	(Maldives) Ashad Ali	1	0	0	0	0	0	5	2	1	0	7	2	2	0
11	MF	(Slovakia) Viliam Macko	1	1	0	0	0	0	5	0	1	0	7	1	2	0
13	MF	(Maldives) Akram Abdul Ghanee	1	0	0	0	0	0	3(1)	0	0(1)	0	4(2)	0	2	0
14	FW	(Maldives) Ahmed Hassan	0	0	0	0	0	0	0	0	0	0	0	0	0	0
15	DF	(Maldives) Abdulla Naajee	0	0	0	0	0	0	0	0	0	0	0	0	0	0
16	FW	(Maldives) Ahmed Suhail	0(1)	0	0	0	0	0	0(4)	0	0(1)	0	0(6)	0	1	0
17	FW	(Maldives) Hamza Mohamed	1	0	0	0	0	0	4(1)	0	0	0	6(1)	0	1	0
18	DF	(Maldives) Ahmed Fairooz	0	0	0	0	0	0	0	0	0	0	0	0	0	0
19	DF	(Maldives) Mohamed Rasheed	1	0	0	0	0	0	5	0	1	0	7	0	0	0
21	MF	(Maldives) Ali Shaamiu	0	0	0	0	0	0	0(1)	0	0	0	0(1)	0	0	0
22	MF	(Maldives) Mohamed Karam	0	0	0	0	0	0	0	0	0	0	0	0	0	0
23	MF	(Maldives) Ahmed Niyaz	1	0	0	0	0	0	4(1)	0	1	0	6(1)	0	1	0
24	FW	(Maldives) Mohamed Samir	0	0	0	0	0	0	1	0	0	0	1	0	0	0
25	GK	(Maldives) Mohamed Yamaan	0	0	0	0	0	0	0	0	0	0	0	0	0	0
26	DF	(Maldives) Shafiu Ahmed	1	0	0	0	0	0	5	0	1	0	7	0	1	0
27	DF	(Maldives) Sobah Mohamed	0	0	0	0	0	0	0	0	0	0	0	0	0	0
—	—	Own goals	—	0	—	0	—	0	—	0	—	0	—	0	—	—

No.	Pos.	Name	League		FA Cup		President's Cup		AFC Cup		Charity Shield		Total		Discipline	
No.	Pos.	Name	Apps	Goals	Apps	Goals	Apps	Goals	Apps	Goals	Apps	Goals	Apps	Goals	Yellow card	Red card
Players who left the club during the season
6	MF	(Nigeria) Patrick Sunday Okoro	0	0	0	0	0	0	3	1	0	0	3	1	0	0
10	FW	(England) David Moli	0	0	0	0	0	0	3	0	1	0	4	0	0	0

=== Goalscorers ===
Last updated: 20 April 2015.
The list is sorted by shirt number when total goals are equal.

Rnk	Pos	No.	Player	League	FA Cup	President's Cup	AFC Cup	Community Shield	Total
1	FW	9	(Maldives) Ashad Ali	0	0	0	2	0	2
2	MF	5	(Maldives) Ibrahim Fazeel	1	0	0	0	0	1
2	MF	6	(Nigeria) Patrick Sunday Okoro	0	0	0	1	0	1
2	MF	7	(Maldives) Ali Fasir	1	0	0	0	0	1
2	MF	11	(Slovakia) Viliam Macko	1	0	0	0	0	1
TOTALS				3	0	0	3	0	6

=== Clean sheets ===
Last updated: 15 April 2015.
The list is sorted by shirt number when total clean sheets are equal.

Rnk	Pos	No.	Player	League	FA Cup	President's Cup	AFC Cup	Community Shield	Total
1	GK	1	(Uzbekistan) Alisher Akhmedov	0	0	0	1	0	1
TOTALS				0	0	0	1	0	1

=== Summary ===
Last updated: 1 January 2015.

Most appearances	# —
Top scorer	# —

== Awards ==
No.	Player	Award	Month	Source
7	(Maldives) Ali Fasir	Haveeru second best footballer of 2014	February	
