= 2003 SAFF Gold Cup squads =

Football squads of South Asian competition

The 2003 South Asian Football Federation Gold Cup is an international football tournament held in Bangladesh from 10 January to 20 January 2003. The eight national teams involved in the tournament were required to register a squad of 23 players, including three goalkeepers. Only players in these squads were eligible to take part in the tournament.

== Group A ==
=== India ===
Coach: (England) Stephen Constantine

No.	Pos.	Player	Date of birth (age)	Caps	Goals	Club
	GK	Naseem Akhtar	7 October 1980 (aged 22)	0	0	(India) Mahindra United
	GK	Rajat Ghosh Dastidar	8 October 1979 (aged 23)	1	0	(India) Mohun Bagan
	GK	Virender Singh	15 December 1974 (aged 28)	15	0	(India) Punjab Police
	DF	Roberto Fernandes	2 November 1971 (aged 31)	25	0	(India) Salgacoar
	DF	Selwyn Fernandes	20 March 1980 (aged 22)	0	0	(India) Vasco
	DF	Debjit Ghosh	23 February 1974 (aged 28)	6	0	(India) Mahindra United
	DF	Samir Naik	8 August 1979 (aged 23)	2	0	(India) Dempo
	DF	Muttath Suresh	19 May 1978 (aged 24)	2	0	(India) East Bengal
	MF	Jules Alberto Dias	2 October 1975 (aged 27)	20	6	(India) Vasco
	MF	Jo Paul Ancheri	2 August 1975 (aged 27)	29	9	(India) JCT Mills
	MF	Abhay Kumar	9 August 1976 (aged 26)	2	0	(India) Vasco
	MF	Climax Lawrence	16 January 1979 (aged 23)	0	0	(India) Salgacoar
	MF	Renedy Singh	20 June 1979 (aged 23)	14	1	(India) Mohun Bagan
	MF	Shanmugam Venkatesh	23 November 1978 (aged 24)	13	0	(India) East Bengal
	FW	Subhash Chakraborty	23 October 1985 (aged 17)	0	0	(India) East Bengal
	FW	Ashim Biswas	14 July 1982 (aged 20)	0	0	(India) Tollygunge Agragami
	FW	Alvito D'Cunha	12 July 1978 (aged 24)	4	0	(India) East Bengal
	FW	Harvinder Singh	15 April 1984 (aged 18)	0	0	(India) JCT Mills
	FW	Inivalappil Mani Vijayan	25 April 1969 (aged 33)	53	29	(India) JCT Mills
	FW	Abhishek Yadav	10 June 1980 (aged 22)	2	0	(India) Mahindra United

=== Sri Lanka ===
Coach: (Brazil) Marcus Fereira

No.	Pos.	Player	Date of birth (age)	Caps	Goals	Club
	GK	Sandun Devinda Sooriyarachige	20 May 1981 (aged 21)	5	0	(Sri Lanka) Police SC
	GK	Sugath Dammika Thilakaratne	6 October 1977 (aged 25)	2	0	(Sri Lanka) Renown
	DF	Dudley Lincoln Steinwall	9 November 1974 (aged 28)	22	2	(Sri Lanka) Renown
	DF	Kamaldeen Mohamed Fuard	12 August 1979 (aged 23)	16	0	(Sri Lanka) Negombo Youth
	DF	Nalin Nandana Kumara	17 December 1979 (aged 23)	3	0	(Sri Lanka) Negombo Youth
	DF	Samantha Prabath Mudiyanselage	11 April 1978 (aged 24)	11	0	(Sri Lanka)
	DF	Rukman Rishantha	3 December 1976 (aged 26)	0	0	(Sri Lanka) Saunders
	DF	Janaka Sanjaya Silva		0	0	(Sri Lanka) Pettah United
	DF	Gihan Janaka		0	0	(Sri Lanka) Police SC
	DF	Mohamed Hassan Hamza	22 January 1976 (aged 26)	1	0	(Sri Lanka) Blue Star
	DF	EIP Perera	30 May 1974 (aged 28)	0	0	(Sri Lanka) Renown
	MF	Imran Mohammed	12 September 1977 (aged 25)	17	0	(India) Indian Bank
	MF	Mohamed Rawme Mohideen	5 June 1979 (aged 23)	0	0	(Sri Lanka) Ratnam
	MF	Chathura Maduranga Weerasinghe	28 January 1981 (aged 21)	11	1	(Sri Lanka) Saunders
	MF	Chathura Maduranga Weerasinghe	28 January 1981 (aged 21)	11	1	(Sri Lanka) Saunders
	MF	Mohamed Asmeer	3 May 1983 (aged 19)	2	0	(Sri Lanka) Negombo Youth
	FW	Neil Krishantha Abeysekera	22 June 1979 (aged 23)	3	0	(Sri Lanka) Renown
	FW	Isuru Perera	11 January 1976 (aged 26)	3	0	(Maldives) Island
	FW	Kasun Nadika Jayasuriya	25 March 1980 (aged 22)	15	7	(India) Indian Bank
	FW	Mohammed Nazar Hameed	14 August 1981 (aged 21)	1	1	(Sri Lanka) Java Lane
	FW	Channa Ediri Bandanage	22 September 1978 (aged 24)	20	6	(India) Dempo

=== Pakistan ===
Coach: (Pakistan) Tariq Lutfi

No.	Pos.	Player	Date of birth (age)	Caps	Goals	Club
1	GK	Jaffar Khan	20 March 1981 (aged 21)	7	0	Pakistan Army
	GK	Abdul Ghani		0	0	(Pakistan) KPT
15	DF	Haroon Yousaf	29 November 1973 (aged 29)	40	3	(Pakistan) ABL
4	DF	Tanveer Ahmed	15 April 1976 (aged 26)	4	0	(Pakistan) WAPDA
19	DF	Muhammad Sameen		1	0	Pakistan Army
2	DF	Amir Shahzad	7 February 1982 (aged 20)	8	0	Pakistan Army
	DF	Sajjad Haider	6 December 1974 (aged 28)	0	0	Pakistan Army
	DF	Mehmood Khan	20 March 1981 (aged 21)	0	0	(Pakistan) Afghan FC
6	MF	Sarfraz Rasool	10 July 1975 (aged 27)	16	1	(Pakistan) KRL
	MF	Zakir Hussain	9 November 1976 (aged 26)	0	0	(Pakistan) WAPDA
8	MF	Sajjad Hussain	12 February 1976 (aged 26)	2	0	(Pakistan) KRL
5	MF	Ashfaq Ahmed	3 January 1983 (aged 20)	0	0	(Pakistan) ABL
14	MF	Muhammad Ayaz	5 November 1975 (aged 27)	0	0	(Pakistan) KRL
	MF	Muhammad Niaz	5 August 1976 (aged 26)	0	0	(Pakistan) WAPDA
7	FW	Qadeer Ahmed	8 November 1978 (aged 24)	2	0	(Pakistan) KRL
9	FW	Shahid Saleem	7 December 1976 (aged 26)	2	0	(Pakistan) HBL
10	FW	Zahid Niaz	21 June 1977 (aged 25)	0	0	(Pakistan) PIA
11	FW	Khuda Bakhsh	15 June 1980 (aged 22)	1	0	(Pakistan) WAPDA
	FW	Muhammad Nawaz	27 November 1974 (aged 28)	0	0	(Pakistan) KPT
	FW	Fareed Majeed	9 July 1974 (aged 28)	5	0	(Pakistan) KPT
3	FW	Muhammad Amir Khan	10 December 1979 (aged 23)	2	0	(Pakistan) ABL

=== Afghanistan ===
Coach: (Germany) Holger Obermann

No.	Pos.	Player	Date of birth (age)	Caps	Goals	Club
1	GK	Abdul Salem Jamshid	1981	0	0	(Afghanistan Football Federation)
5	DF	Ahmad Rahil Fourmoli	1972	0	0	(Afghanistan Football Federation)
	DF	Najib Naderi	22 February 1984 (aged 18)	0	0	(German Football Association) Altona 93
	DF	Omar Azhar		0	0	(German Football Association)
	DF	Ahmed Zia Azimi	1977	0	0	(Afghanistan Football Federation)
	DF	Aziz Rohallah	5 July 1980 (aged 22)	0	0	(Afghanistan Football Federation)
	DF	Bashir Ahmad Saadat	27 December 1981 (aged 21)	0	0	(Afghanistan Football Federation) Maiwand
	MF	Omar Nazar	1 November 1978 (aged 24)	0	0	(German Football Association) VfL Lohbrügge
	MF	Ahmad Nasir Safi	1 January 1983 (aged 20)	0	0	(German Football Association) Darmstadt 98
	MF	Farid Ahmadi	6 February 1988 (aged 14)	0	0	(Afghanistan Football Federation)
	MF	Najiballah Zarimi	1979	0	0	(Afghanistan Football Federation)
	MF	Wahidullah Nazari	12 July 1984 (aged 18)	0	0	(Afghanistan Football Federation)
14	FW	Davoud Yaqoubi	17 December 1982 (aged 20)	0	0	(German Football Association) SV Lurup
9	FW	Raza Razai	16 February 1980 (aged 22)	0	0	(Afghanistan Football Federation)
11	FW	Obaidullah Karimi	21 December 1979 (aged 23)	0	0	(German Football Association) Altona 93
	FW	Sayed Tahir Shah	5 February 1980 (aged 22)	0	0	(Afghanistan Football Federation) Shahid Balkhi FC
	FW	Basir Kamrani	5 March 1980 (aged 22)	0	0	(Afghanistan Football Federation) Maiwand

== Group B ==
=== Bangladesh ===
Coach: (Austria) George Kottan

No.	Pos.	Player	Date of birth (age)	Caps	Goals	Club
	GK	Biplob Bhattacharjee	1 July 1981 (aged 21)	13	0	(Bangladesh) Arambagh Krira Sangha
	GK	Aminul Haque	5 October 1980 (aged 22)	16	0	(Bangladesh) Muktijoddha Sangsad
	DF	Rajani Kanta Barman	12 May 1976 (aged 26)	25	0	(Bangladesh) Muktijoddha Sangsad
	DF	Kazi Nazrul Islam	16 October 1978 (aged 24)	13	0	(Bangladesh) Abahani Limited
	DF	Mohammed Sujan	1 June 1982 (aged 20)	8	2	(Bangladesh) Muktijoddha Sangsad
	DF	Mahmudul Hasan	18 July 1982 (aged 20)	0	0	(Bangladesh) Mohammedan
	DF	Hassan Al-Mamun	16 November 1974 (aged 28)	28	0	(Bangladesh) Muktijoddha Sangsad
	DF	Firoj Mahmud Titu	7 December 1979 (aged 23)	12	0	(Bangladesh) Mohammedan
	MF	Abdul Kayum Sentu	16 December 1979 (aged 23)	0	0	(Bangladesh) Mohammedan
	MF	Mohammed Monwar Hossain	30 August 1979 (aged 23)	18	1	(Bangladesh) Mohammedan
	MF	Arman Mia	10 October 1977 (aged 25)	17	0	(Bangladesh) Muktijoddha Sangsad
	MF	Faisal Mahmud	16 December 1982 (aged 20)	0	0	(Bangladesh) Mohammedan
	MF	Arif Khan Joy	20 November 1971 (aged 31)	0	0	(Bangladesh) Mohammedan
	MF	Rokonuzzaman Kanchan	22 June 1982 (aged 20)	9	1	(Bangladesh) Mohammedan
	MF	Mustafa Anwar Parvez Babu	25 July 1978 (aged 24)	8	0	(Bangladesh) Abahani Limited
	MF	Motiur Rahman Munna	1 September 1979 (aged 23)	24	1	(Bangladesh) Muktijoddha Sangsad
	FW	Saifur Rahman Moni	2 February 1981 (aged 21)	12	1	(Bangladesh) Muktijoddha Sangsad
	FW	Alfaz Ahmed	6 June 1973 (aged 29)	32	8	(Bangladesh) Muktijoddha Sangsad
	FW	Mehedi Hasan Ujjal	26 April 1985 (aged 17)	0	0	(Bangladesh) Badda Jagoroni Sangsad
	FW	Ariful Kabir Farhad	12 March 1980 (aged 22)	1	0	(Bangladesh) Mohammedan
	FW	Saiful Islam Saif	10 February 1980 (aged 22)	0	0	(Bangladesh) Arambagh Krira Sangha

=== Bhutan ===
Coach: (Netherlands) Henk Walk

No.	Pos.	Player	Date of birth (age)	Caps	Goals	Club
	GK	Jigme Singye	2 June 1974 (aged 28)	2	0	(Bhutan)
	GK	Puspalal Sharma	25 June 1984 (aged 18)	0	0	(Bhutan) Transport United
	DF	Krishna Subba	14 May 1972 (aged 30)	0	0	(Bhutan)
	DF	Bhim Kumar Chhetri	13 January 1977 (aged 25)	1	0	(Bhutan)
	DF	Chencho Nio	3 March 1986 (aged 16)	0	0	(Bhutan) Druk Stars
	DF	Pema Dorji	5 July 1985 (aged 17)	1	0	(Bhutan)
	DF	Karma Yeshi		1	0	(Bhutan)
	DF	Nangze Dorji		1	0	(Bhutan)
	DF	Namgye Dorji	11 November 1979 (aged 23)	0	0	(Bhutan)
	MF	Passang Tshering	16 July 1983 (aged 19)	1	0	(Bhutan) Transport United
	MF	Kinley Dorji	30 August 1986 (aged 16)	1	0	(Bhutan) Thimphu FC
	MF	Sonam Tobgye	6 April 1984 (aged 18)	0	0	(Bhutan)
	MF	Pema Chophel	6 August 1981 (aged 21)	0	0	(Bhutan)
	MF	Sonam Jamtsho	14 November 1983 (aged 19)	1	0	(Bhutan) Thimphu FC
	MF	Ugyen Wangchuk	10 October 1973 (aged 29)	0	0	(Bhutan)
	MF	Ugyen Dorji	10 October 1974 (aged 28)	2	0	(Bhutan)
	MF	Nawang Dhendup	20 September 1984 (aged 18)	0	0	(Bhutan)
	MF	Sangay Dukpa	1 January 1970 (aged 33)	1	0	(Bhutan)
	FW	Wangay Dorji	9 January 1974 (aged 29)	5	3	(Bhutan) Samtse
	FW	Dorji Khandu	3 March 1986 (aged 16)	1	0	(Bhutan) Druk Stars
	FW	Sonam Tenzin	20 October 1986 (aged 16)	1	0	(India) Buddhist Blue Stars
	FW	Dinesh Chhetri	23 February 1970 (aged 32)	3	2	(Bhutan)

=== Maldives ===
Coach: (Slovakia) Jozef Jankech

No.	Pos.	Player	Date of birth (age)	Caps	Goals	Club
	GK	Aslam Abdul Raheem	2 October 1974 (aged 28)	7	0	(Maldives) Club Valencia
	GK	Imran Mohamed	18 December 1980 (aged 22)	13	0	(Maldives) Victory
	DF	Mohamed Jameel	4 October 1975 (aged 27)	8	1	(Maldives) Club Valencia
	DF	Assad Abdul Ghani	2 January 1976 (aged 27)	5	0	(Maldives) Club Valencia
	DF	Ismail Naseem	26 December 1972 (aged 30)	6	1	(Maldives) Island FC
	DF	Sobah Mohamed	18 April 1980 (aged 22)	3	0	(Maldives) Club Valencia
	DF	Yoosuf Azeem	2 February 1973 (aged 29)	11	0	(Maldives) Island FC
	DF	Hussain Luthfy	4 June 1975 (aged 27)	10	0	(Maldives) New Radiant
	DF	Ibrahim Amil	6 May 1978 (aged 24)	0	0	(Maldives) New Radiant
	MF	Ali Umar	5 August 1980 (aged 22)	10	2	(Maldives) Club Valencia
	MF	Ibrahim Fazeel	9 October 1980 (aged 22)	10	1	(Maldives) Island FC
	MF	Ahmed Naaz	21 August 1977 (aged 25)	0	0	(Maldives) Island FC
	MF	Ashraf Luthfy	16 June 1973 (aged 29)	19	1	(Maldives) New Radiant
	MF	Mohamed Hussain	12 October 1979 (aged 23)	13	0	(Maldives) New Radiant
	MF	Ahmed Niyaz	17 March 1980 (aged 22)	0	0	(Maldives) Island FC
	MF	Ali Shiham	26 June 1976 (aged 26)	12	3	(Maldives) Club Valencia
	MF	Hussain Habeeb	6 April 1980 (aged 22)	0	0	(Maldives) Club Valencia
	FW	Mohamed Nizam	2 September 1972 (aged 30)	25	4	(Maldives) Club Valencia
	FW	Adam Abdul Latheef	20 August 1972 (aged 30)	18	7	(Maldives) Island FC
	FW	Shah Ismail	14 February 1971 (aged 31)	26	3	(Maldives) New Radiant
	FW	Ahmed Thoriq	4 October 1984 (aged 18)	0	0	(Maldives) CHSE
	FW	Ismail Mohamed	16 March 1980 (aged 22)	0	0	(Maldives) Victory

- Mohamed Areesh
- Abdullah Ibrahim
- Fareed Mohamed
- Mohamed
- Ishaq Easa
- Ibrahim Sagib
- Ahmed Janah
- Ahmed Thoha

=== Nepal ===
Coach: (South Korea) Yoo Kee-heung

No.	Pos.	Player	Date of birth (age)	Caps	Goals	Club
	GK	Upendra Man Singh	27 July 1973 (aged 29)	26	0	(Nepal) Manang Marshyangdi
	GK	Channu Ram Chaudhary	4 December 1972 (aged 30)	1	0	Nepal Army
	DF	Sagar Thapa	21 November 1985 (aged 17)	0	0	(Nepal) Friends Club
	DF	Dev Narayan Chaudhary	13 February 1972 (aged 30)	26	0	(Nepal) Mahendra Police
	DF	Rakesh Shrestha	14 January 1977 (aged 25)	18	0	(Nepal) Mahendra Police
	DF	Narayan Manandhar	3 October 1981 (aged 21)	5	0	(Nepal) Ranipokhari Corner Team
	DF	Narottam Gautam	29 December 1977 (aged 25)	3	0	(Nepal)
	DF	Janak Singh	28 March 1985 (aged 17)	0	0	(Nepal) Mahendra Police
	MF	Rajesh Shahi Khadagi	31 January 1980 (aged 22)	0	0	(Nepal) Manang Marshyangdi
	MF	Nabin Neupane	13 October 1982 (aged 20)	0	0	(Nepal) Manang Marshyangdi
	MF	Deepak Lama	9 September 1983 (aged 19)	7	1	(Nepal) Manang Marshyangdi
	MF	Basanta Gauchan Thakali	24 July 1983 (aged 19)	9	0	(Nepal) Manang Marshyangdi
	MF	Sunil Tuladhar	8 October 1977 (aged 25)	22	0	(Nepal) Boys Union Club
	MF	Bal Gopal Maharjan	28 August 1975 (aged 27)	21	4	(Nepal) Mahendra Police
	MF	Raj Kumar Shrestha	10 October 1979 (aged 23)	1	0	(Nepal) Friends Club
	MF	Kumar Thapa	18 August 1981 (aged 21)	17	0	(Nepal) Manang Marshyangdi
	MF	Ananta Raj Thapa	19 October 1977 (aged 25)	4	0	(Nepal) Mahendra Police
	FW	Rajan Rayamajhi	29 January 1980 (aged 22)	5	1	(Nepal) Manang Marshyangdi
	FW	Surendra Tamang	23 February 1981 (aged 21)	0	0	(Nepal) Galaxian Club
	FW	Sukra Man Tamang	25 December 1976 (aged 26)	6	0	(Nepal) Friends Club
	FW	Ramesh Budathoki	11 April 1978 (aged 24)	3	0	(Nepal) Mahendra Police
	FW	Hari Khadka	26 November 1976 (aged 26)	25	12	(India) Mohun Bagan
	FW	Basanta Thapa	10 April 1977 (aged 25)	17	5	(Bangladesh) Rahmatganj MFS
	FW	Nirajan Rayamajhi	29 January 1980 (aged 22)	8	8	(Nepal) Friends Club
