= Davoud =

Davoud is a given name. Notable people with the name include:

- Davoud Abedinzadeh (born 1986), Iranian wrestler
- Davoud Daneshdoost (born 1985), Iranian footballer
- Davoud Danesh-Jafari, Minister of Economy and Finance Affairs of Iran
- Davoud Fanaei (born 1976), Iranian football goalkeeper
- Davoud Haghi (born 1981), Iranian football player
- Davoud Hermidas-Bavand (born 1934), Iranian political scientist
- Davoud Mahabadi (born 1973), Iranian football manager and former player
- Davoud Noshi Sofiani (born 1990), Iranian football goalkeeper
- Davoud Rashidi (born 1933), Iranian actor
- Davoud Seyed Abbasi (born 1977), Iranian football player who plays in the midfield position
- Davoud Soleymani, Iranian politician
- Davoud Yaqoubi, Afghan footballer
