= Dhiffushi =

Dhiffushi may refer to several small islands in the Maldives

- Dhiffushi (Alif Dhaal Atoll)
- Dhiffushi (Kaafu Atoll)
- Dhiffushi, in the Kolhumadulu Atoll
