= Mohamed Shaffaz =

Maldivian footballer

Personal information
- Full name: Mohamed Shaffaz
- Date of birth: 14 June 1982 (age 44)
- Place of birth: Eydhafushi, Maldives
- Height: 1.71 m (5 ft 7 in)
- Positions: Midfielder; defender

Senior career*
Years	Team	Apps	(Gls)
2001–2002	Sports Club Mecano	4	(1)
2004–2006	Valencia		
2007–2008	Victory		
2009–2010	VB Sports Club		
2011–2012	Victory		
2013	BG Sports Club		
2015	New Radiant		
2016	TC Sports Club		
2017–2018	Green Streets		
2020	JJ Sports Club	1	(0)

International career
2004	Maldives	2	(0)
- * Club domestic league appearances and goals

Mohamed Shaffaz is a Maldivian footballer, who is currently playing for JJ Sports Club.

== International career ==
On 3 June 2004, Shaffaz made his debut for Maldives against Oman in a friendly match, replacing Ibrahim Amil in the 4-1 loss, for the complete second half. He started his first game for Maldives in a 3-0 loss to Oman, on 31 May 2004, playing the full 90 minutes.
