= Sunday Patrick Okoro =

Nigerian footballer

Patrick Okoro
Personal information
- Full name: Sunday Patrick Okoro
- Date of birth: 27 April 1986 (age 40)
- Place of birth: Nigeria
- Height: 1.94 m (6 ft 4 in)
- Position: Forward

Team information
- Current team: New Radiant
- Number: 6

Senior career*
Years	Team	Apps	(Gls)
2005–2006	Shooting Stars		
2006–2007	Germinal Beerschot	1	(0)
2007	Beveren		
2007	HSV Hoek		
2008	B36 Tórshavn	3	(1)
2009	B71 Sandoy	11	(1)
2008–2010	Radnički Pirot		
2012–2013	SC 84 Mettinghausen		
2013	Al-Quwa Al-Jawiya		
2013–2014	Al-Thawra		
2014–	New Radiant		
- * Club domestic league appearances and goals

Sunday Patrick Okoro (born 27 April 1986) is a Nigerian professional footballer playing with Dhivehi Premier League side New Radiant.

== Career ==
Okoro previously played professionally for Serbian club FK Radnički Pirot, Belgian clubs KSK Beveren and Germinal Beerschot and semi professionally for Nigeria side Shooting Stars, Faroes clubs B36 Tórshavn and B71 Sandoy. He also played amateur football for HSV Hoek. He played with German side SC 84 Mettinghausen in the 2012–13 season. He afterwards moved to Asia where he played with Iraqi Premier League side Al-Quwa Al-Jawiya in 2013, and also Iraqi club, Al-Thawra, in 2013–14. In summer 2014 he joined New Radiant top-flight side from the Maldives.
