= 2015 POMIS Cup =

People's Cup

Tournament details
- Host country: Maldives
- Dates: 22 January – 28 January
- Teams: 4 (from 1 confederation)
- Venue(s): 1 (in 1 host city)

Final positions
- Champions: (Malaysia) PDRM FA (1st title)
- Runners-up: (Maldives) Maziya S&RC
- Third place: (Singapore) LionsXII
- Fourth place: (Maldives) New Radiant SC

Tournament statistics
- Matches played: 7
- Goals scored: 22 (3.14 per match)
- Top scorer(s): (Mali) Dramane Traoré (5 goals)
- Best player(s): (Mali) Dramane Traoré (PDRM FA)
- Best goalkeeper: (Maldives) Imran Mohamed (Maziya S&RC)

The 2015 POMIS Cup is the 17th championship, starting group matches on 22 January 2015 and the final match played on 28 January 2015 at National Football Stadium, Malé, Maldives. PDRM FA won the People's Cup final against Maziya S&RC.

== Teams ==
The top two teams of 2014 Dhivehi League and two invited foreign clubs.

=== Teams and nation ===
Note: Table lists clubs in alphabetical order.

Team	Nation
Maziya S&RC	Maldives
New Radiant SC	Maldives
PDRM FA	Malaysia
Singapore LionsXII	Singapore

=== Standings ===
Pos	Team	Pld	W	D	L	GF	GA	GD	Pts	Qualification
1	PDRM FA	3	2	1	0	4	2	+2	7	Final
2	Maziya S&RC	3	1	2	0	4	3	+1	5	Final
3	Singapore LionsXII	3	1	0	2	4	4	0	3	
4	New Radiant SC	3	0	1	2	1	4	-3	1	

Rules for classification: 1) points; 2) goal difference; 3) number of goals scored.

== Matches ==
=== Group matches ===
A total of 6 matches will be playing in this round.

22 January 2015	Maziya S&RC	2–1	Singapore LionsXII	National Football Stadium, Malé
16:00	Rodríguez 73'; Amdhan 90'	Report	83' Madhu

22 January 2015	PDRM FA	1–0	New Radiant SC	National Football Stadium, Malé
21:00	Sumareh 63'	Report		Referee: Shifan Abdul Raheem (Maldives)

24 January 2015	New Radiant SC	1–3	Singapore LionsXII	National Football Stadium, Malé
16:00	Niyaz 85'	Report	4' Firdaus; 49' Madhu; 59' Amri	Referee: Ali Zaeem (Maldives)

24 January 2015	PDRM FA	2–2	Maziya S&RC	National Football Stadium, Malé
21:00	Traoré 40', 61'	Report	27', 59' Rodríguez

26 January 2015	New Radiant SC	0–0	Maziya S&RC	National Football Stadium, Malé
16:00		Report		Referee: Shifan Abdul Raheem (Maldives)

26 January 2015	PDRM FA	1–0	Singapore LionsXII	National Football Stadium, Malé
21:00	Traoré 52' (pen.)	Report		Referee: Ahmed Ameez (Maldives)

=== Final ===
28 January 2015	PDRM FA	5–4 (a.e.t.)	Maziya S&RC	National Football Stadium, Malé
21:00	Traoré 12', 96'; Ashfaq 24', 51', 108'	Report	Irufaan 73'; Assadhulla 86' (pen.); Imaaz 90+1'; Rodríguez 112'	Referee: Shifan Abdul Raheem (Maldives)

== Statistics ==
=== Scorers ===
Rank	Player	Club	Goals
1	(Mali) Dramane Traoré	PDRM	5
2	(Spain) Pablo Rodríguez	Maziya	4
3	(Maldives) Ali Ashfaq	PDRM	3
4	(Singapore) Madhu Mohana	LionsXII	2
5	(Maldives) Amdhan Ali	Maziya	1
5	(The Gambia) Mohamadou Sumareh	PDRM	1
5	(Singapore) Firdaus Kasman	LionsXII	1
5	(Singapore) Khairul Amri	LionsXII	1
5	(Maldives) Ahmed Niyaz	New Radiant	1
5	(Maldives) Mohamed Irufaan	Maziya	1
5	(Maldives) Assadhulla Abdulla	Maziya	1
5	(Maldives) Ahmed Imaaz	Maziya	1

=== Assists ===
Rank	Player	Club	Assists
1	(Maldives) Hussain Niyaz Mohamed	Maziya	4
2	(Singapore) Khairul Amri	LionsXII	2
3	(Spain) Pablo Rodríguez	Maziya	1
3	(Malaysia) Ahmad Ezrie Shafizie	PDRM	1
3	(Singapore) Zulfahmi Arifin	LionsXII	1
3	(Malaysia) Fadhil Hashim	PDRM	1
3	(Maldives) Ahmed Nashid	Maziya	1
3	(Maldives) Assadhulla Abdulla	Maziya	1
