= Najib Naderi =

Afghan footballer

Personal information
- Date of birth: 22 February 1984 (age 42)
- Place of birth: Kabul, Afghanistan
- Height: 1.79 m (5 ft 10 in)
- Position: Defender

Senior career*
Years	Team	Apps	(Gls)
2001–2002	Hamburger SV		
2002–2004	Altona 93	26	(0)
2004–2005	TSV Bargteheide		
2005–2009	Barsbütteler SV		

International career
2003	Afghanistan	4	(0)
- * Club domestic league appearances and goals

Najib Naderi (Persian: نجیب نادری; born 22 February 1984) is an Afghan former footballer who played as a defender and made four appearances for the Afghanistan national team in 2003.

== Career statistics ==
Appearances and goals by national team and year
National team	Year	Apps	Goals
Afghanistan	2003	4	0
Total		4	0
