= David Moli =

English footballer (born 1995)

Personal information
- Date of birth: 8 January 1995 (age 31)
- Place of birth: England
- Position: Forward

Team information
- Current team: Alsager Town

Youth career
- –2009: Luton
- 2009–2011: Liverpool
- 2012–2013: Wolverhampton Wanderers

Senior career*
Years	Team	Apps	(Gls)
2013–2014	Boreham Wood	15	(1)
2014–2015	Hayes & Yeading	2	(0)
2015	New Radiant		
2016	Épinal	8	(0)
2016–2017	Nuneaton Borough	12	(0)
2017	Stomil Olsztyn	0	(0)
2017	Welling United		
2017–2018	Coventry United		
2018	Vaprus	1	(0)
2022–	Alsager Town		
- * Club domestic league appearances and goals

David Moli (born 8 January 1995) is an English footballer who plays as a forward for Alsager Town.

== Career ==
As a youth player, Moli joined the youth academy of English third tier side Luton. In 2009, he joined the youth academy of Liverpool in the English Premier League. Before the second half of 2011–12, he joined the youth academy of English second tier club Wolves. In 2015, Moli signed for New Radiant in the Maldives, after trialing for Maltese team Valletta. Before the second half of 2015–16, he signed for Épinal in the French third tier.

In 2017, Moli signed for Welling United in the English sixth tier after a two-month stint with Polish second tier outfit Stomil Olsztyn. After that, he signed for Coventry United in the English ninth tier. In 2018, he signed for Estonian top flight side Vaprus. In 2022, Moli signed for Alsager Town in the English tenth tier.
