= Narayan Manandhar =

Nepalese footballer

Personal information
- Date of birth: 3 October 1981 (age 45)
- Place of birth: Nepal
- Position: Defender

Senior career*
Years	Team	Apps	(Gls)
- RCT
–2003	Three Star		

International career
2001–2003	Nepal	12	(0)
- * Club domestic league appearances and goals

Narayan Manandhar (born 3 October 1981) is a Nepalese former footballer who is last known to have played as a defender for Three Star.

== Career ==
On 29 September 2003, after a 0-16 loss to South Korea, Manandhar defected to South Korea.
