= Aslam Abdul Raheem =

Maldivian footballer

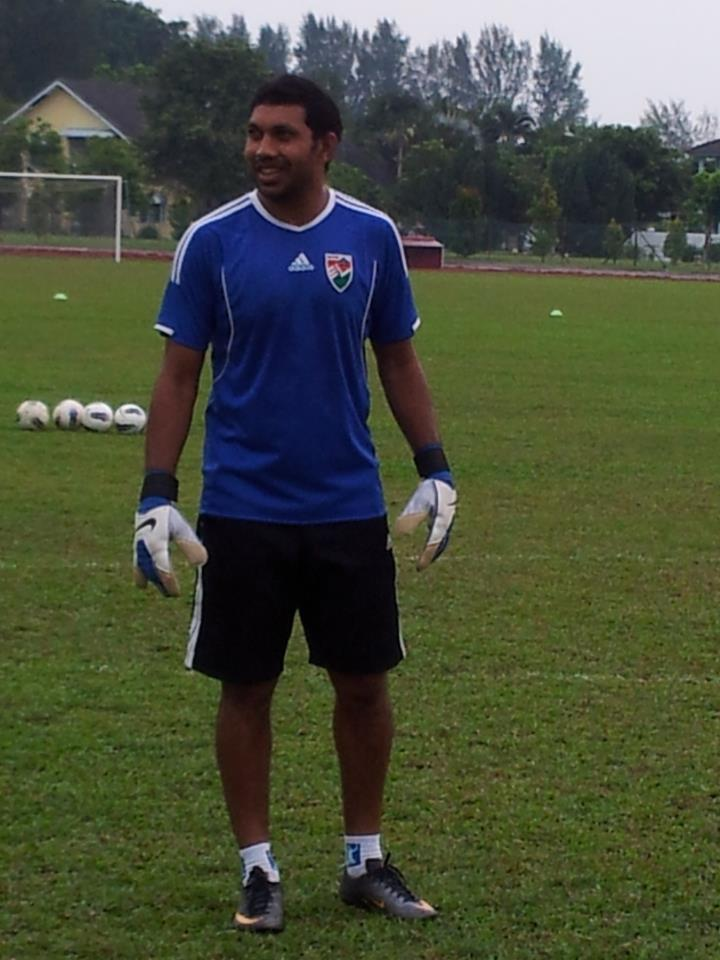

Personal information
- Full name: Aslam Abdul Raheem
- Date of birth: 2 October 1974 (age 52)
- Place of birth: Maldives
- Position: Goalkeeper

Senior career*
Years	Team	Apps	(Gls)
–1999	New Radiant		
2000–2006	Club Valencia		

International career
1997–2004	Maldives		(0)
- * Club domestic league appearances and goals

Aslam Abdul Raheem (born 24 June 1971) is a retired Maldivian footballer who played as a goalkeeper, and a current goalkeeper trainer at Club Valencia. He is also the goalkeeper trainer of the senior Maldives national football team and all youth levels.

== International career ==
Aslam has appeared in FIFA World Cup qualifying matches for the Maldives.
