= Davoud Yaqoubi =

Afghan footballer

Personal information
- Full name: Davoud Yaqoubi
- Date of birth: December 17, 1982 (age 43)
- Place of birth: Afghanistan
- Position: Forward

Senior career*
Years	Team	Apps	(Gls)
1999–2000	SC Concordia Hamburg		
2000–2004	SV Lurup Hamburg		
2004–2009	SC Concordia Hamburg		

International career
2003	Afghanistan	2	(0)
- * Club domestic league appearances and goals

Davoud Yaqoubi (Persian: داود یعقوبی; December 17, 1982) is an Afghan footballer who last played for SC Concordia Hamburg.

== National team statistics ==
Afghanistan national team
Year	Apps	Goals
2003	2	0
Total	2	0
