= Dhiffushi (Kaafu Atoll) =

Inhabited island in Kaafu Atoll, Maldives

Dhiffushi ދިއްފުށި
- Inhabited island
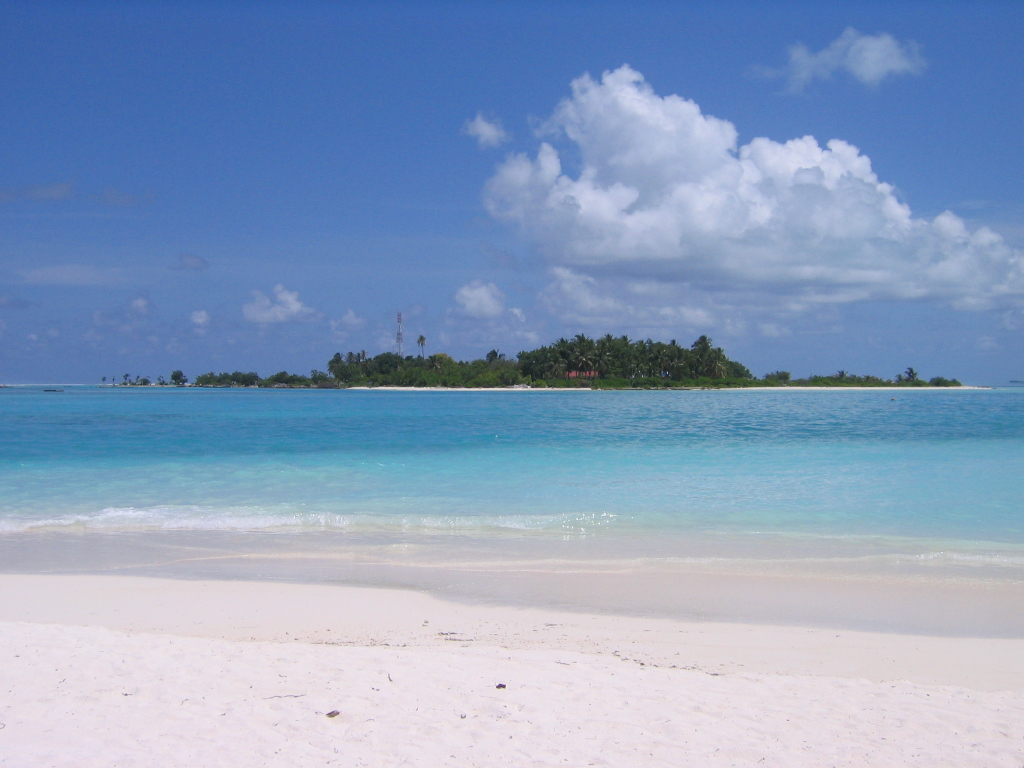
- Kaafu Atoll

- Location in Maldives
- Coordinates: 4°26′28″N 73°42′40″E
- Country: Maldives
- Administrative atoll: Kaafu Atoll
- Distance to Malé: 36.99 km (22.98 mi)

Dimensions
  - Length: 0.950 km (0.590 mi)
  - Width: 0.200 km (0.124 mi)

Population (2022)
  - Total: 1,270
- Time zone: UTC+05:00 (MST)

Dhiffushi (Dhivehi: ދިއްފުށި) is an inhabited island in Kaafu Atoll (North Malé Atoll) in the Republic of Maldives. Located approximately 37 kilometers northeast of Malé, the capital city, it is the easternmost inhabited island in the Maldives and witnesses the country’s first sunrise.

== Geography ==
Dhiffushi measures approximately 0.95 kilometers in length and 0.20 kilometers in width, covering a total land area of around 22.3 hectares.

The island is surrounded by coral reefs and features a natural lagoon rich in marine life, allowing for direct snorkeling access from the shore.

== Beaches ==
Dhiffushi has designated tourist beaches, including North Beach, South Beach, and East Beach.

North Beach is known for stingray spotting. South Beach features sunbeds, swings, and a beach bar, while East Beach is a favorite for sunrise viewing.

== Demographics ==
As of the 2022 census, Dhiffushi has a population of approximately 1,270 residents (including foreigners).

Tourism has grown since 2009 after the Maldivian government allowed guesthouses on local islands.

== Governance ==
Dhiffushi is governed by an elected Island Council as per the 2010 Decentralization Act.

== Infrastructure ==
Facilities include a health center, school, mosques, harbor, ATM, gas station, and a football turf. The guesthouse sector is locally operated.

== Marine Life ==
Dhiffushi’s waters feature coral reefs home to stingrays, sharks, and sea turtles. Snorkeling and night snorkeling are popular activities.

== Tourism and Activities ==
Visitors enjoy diving, snorkeling, dolphin cruises, and excursions to nearby sandbanks.

== Transportation ==
Dhiffushi is reachable by public ferry (2–3 hours) or shared speedboat (40–45 minutes, approx. USD 35).

== Culture ==
Dhiffushi offers an authentic local experience in contrast to resort islands. Tourism supports the local economy through community-led initiatives.

== Notable people ==
- Ahmed Rizuvan, football player

== Gallery ==
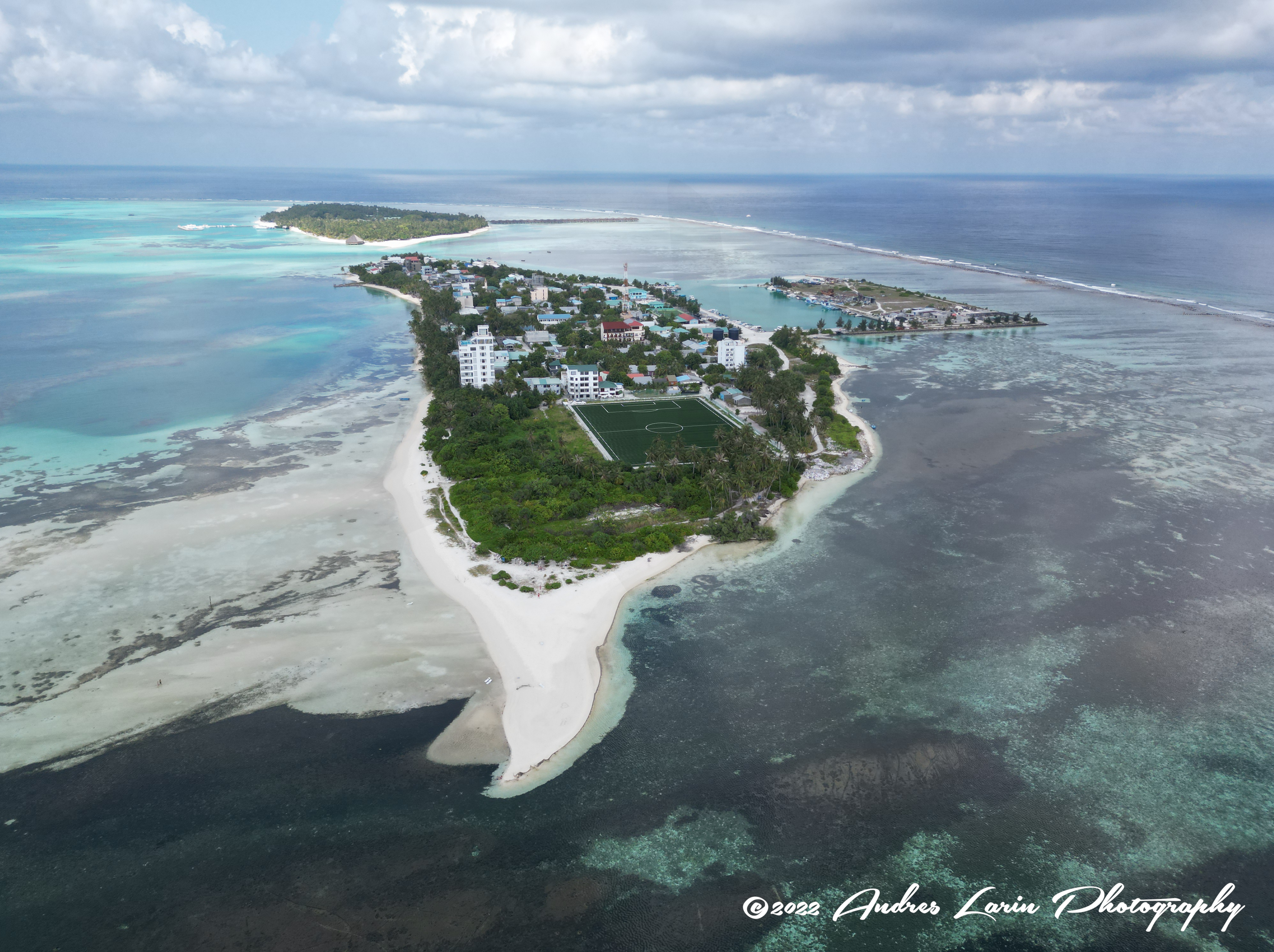
Drone shot of Dhiffushi island

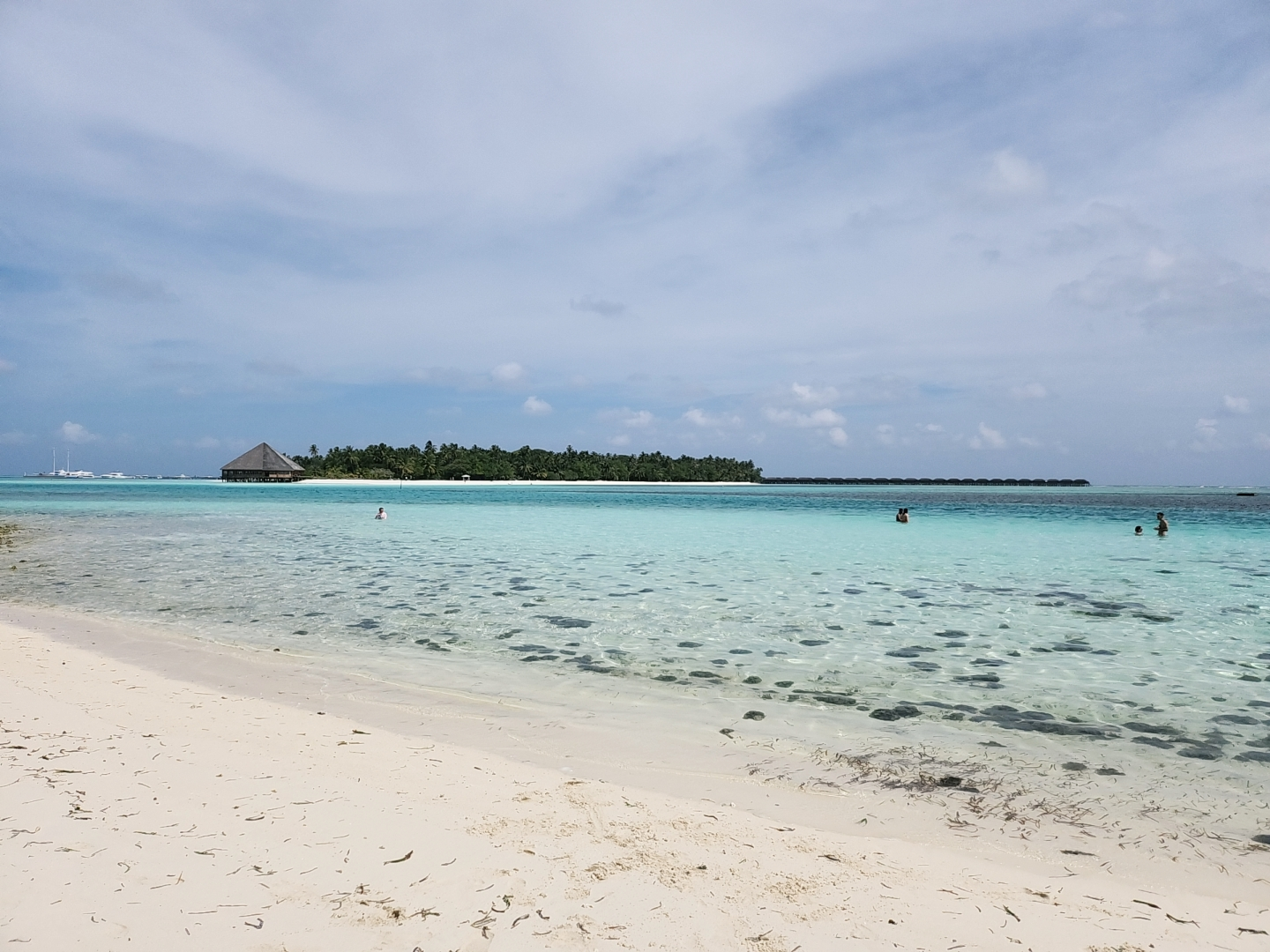
Dhiffushi Beach

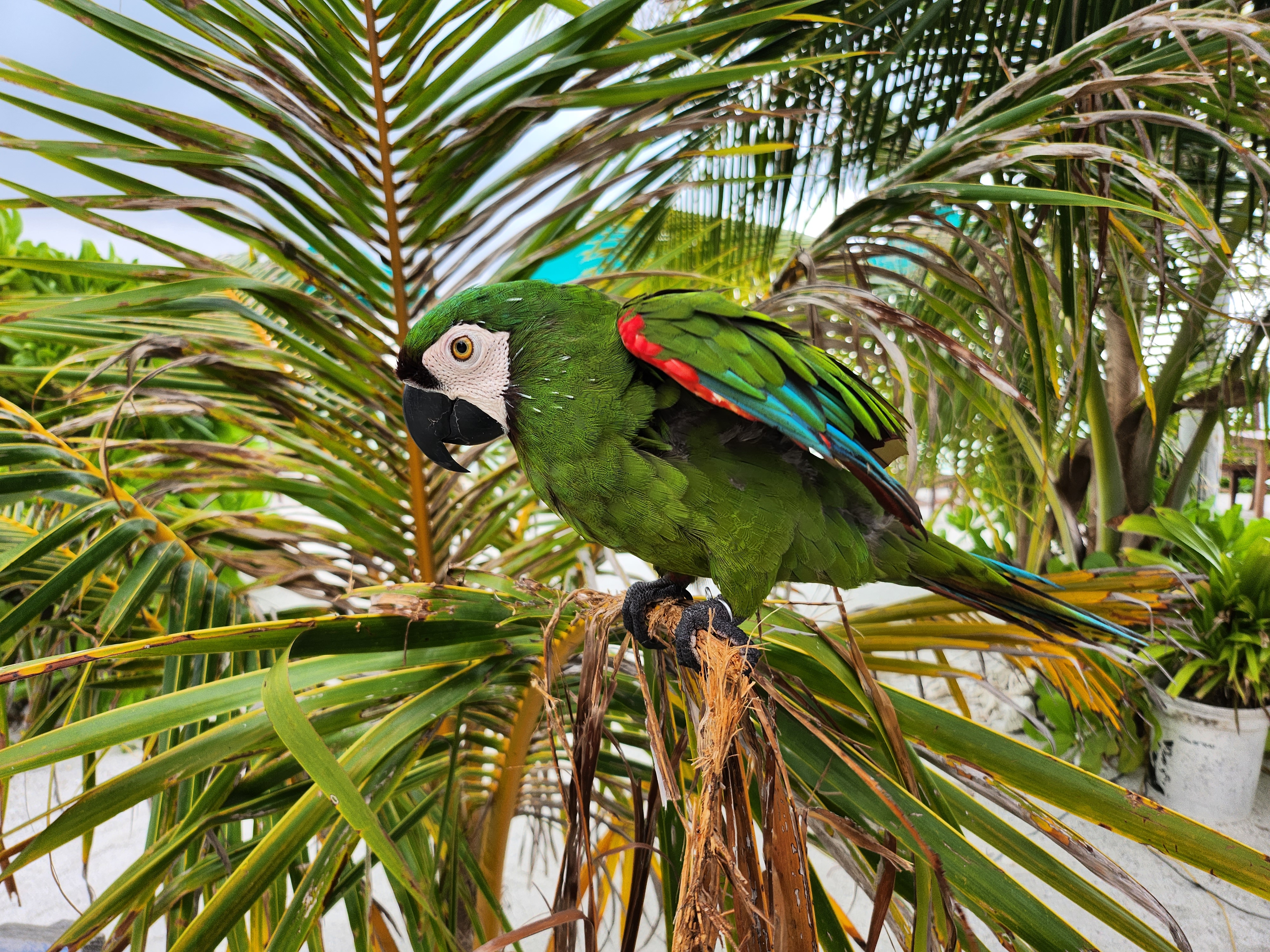
Parrot in Dhiffushi
