= Ibrahim Amil =

Maldivian footballer

Personal information
- Full name: Ibrahim Amil
- Date of birth: 6 May 1978 (age 48)
- Place of birth: Neykurendhoo, Maldives
- Height: 1.67 m (5 ft 6 in)
- Position: Defender

Senior career*
Years	Team	Apps	(Gls)
2001	Club Eagles		
2002–2003	New Radiant		
2004	Island FC		
2004–????	Valencia		
????–????	Island FC		
????–2009	New Radiant		
2011	Club Eagles		

International career
2003–2008	Maldives		
- * Club domestic league appearances and goals

Ibrahim Amil (born 6 May 1978) is a retired Maldivian international footballer.

== Club career ==
Amil started his career at Club Eagles in 2001 and then moved to New Radiant for the next two seasons. He played a half season for Island FC in 2004, before moving to Club Valencia. Later he played again for Island FC before returning to New Radiant and was with the club until 2009. Amil was away from football in 2010 for unknown reasons, but spent one last season at Club Eagles in 2011.

== International career ==
Amil represented Maldives in SAFF Championship and FIFA World Cup qualification matches.
